= Henry Lawrence (East India Company officer) =

Bengal Army officer (1806–1857)

Brigadier-General Sir Henry Lawrence KCB
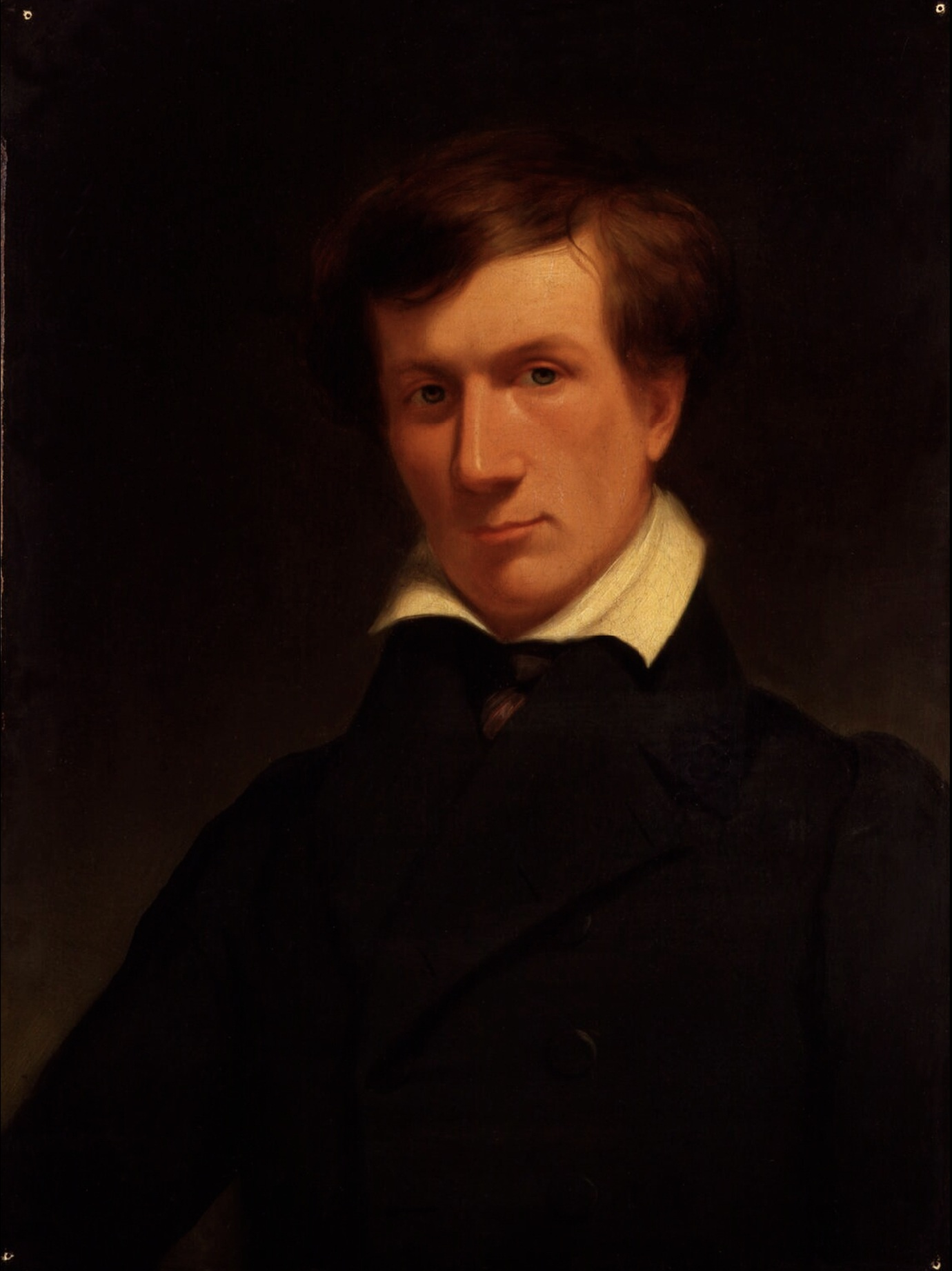
- 1827 portrait
- Born: 28 June 1806; Matara, British Ceylon
- Died: 4 July 1857 (aged 51); Lucknow, Oudh State, Company India
- Spouse: Honoria Marshall (m. 1837)
- Relatives: Sir George Lawrence (brother); John Lawrence, 1st Baron Lawrence (brother)
- Military career
- Allegiance: East India Company
- Branch: Bengal Army
- Service years: 1823–1857
- Rank: Brigadier-General
- Unit: Bengal Artillery
- Conflicts: First Burmese War; First Anglo-Afghan War; First Anglo-Sikh War: Battle of Sobraon; Second Anglo-Sikh War: Battle of Chillianwala; Indian Mutiny: Siege of Lucknow †
- Awards: Knight Commander of the Order of the Bath
- Other work: Resident Minister at Lahore; Chief Commissioner of Awadh

Brigadier-General Sir Henry Montgomery Lawrence (28 June 1806 – 4 July 1857) was a Bengal Army officer, surveyor and colonial administrator. He is known for leading a group of British officials in the Punjab known as Henry Lawrence's "Young Men", founding the Lawrence Military Asylums and for dying at the siege of Lucknow during the Indian Rebellion of 1857.

== Background ==
Lawrence was born in June 1806 into an Ulster-Scots family at Matara in Ceylon. Each of his parents had a background in Ulster (the northern province of Ireland): his mother Letitia was the daughter of the Rev. George Knox from County Donegal, while his father, Lieutenant-Colonel Alexander William Lawrence, born the son of a mill-owner from Coleraine, County Londonderry, entered the service of the British Army and achieved distinction at the 1799 Siege of Seringapatnam. The Lawrences had seven sons, the first died in infancy and the fifth at the age of eighteen. The remaining five all achieved distinction in India; of them Sir George Lawrence and Lord Lawrence would achieve particular fame.

In 1812, Lawrence, along with his elder brothers Alexander and George, was sent to Foyle College in Derry, a city in Ulster, where their uncle Rev. James Knox was headmaster. In 1818 he rejoined his parents in Bristol where they had since settled, and completed his schooling there. In August 1820 he again followed his elder brothers by entering the East India Company Military Seminary in Addiscombe, Surrey. (His father, having felt slighted by the lack of recognition afforded to him for his service in the British Army, encouraged his sons to instead enter the service of the East India Company in India.) Whilst at the seminary, he was saved from drowning by a fellow cadet Robert Guthrie MacGregor. On another occasion, he developed sympathy for a lady in poverty, and begged old clothes from his family which he then carried to her through the streets of London — he would remember that same lady in his will some thirty-five years later. Contemporaries in his class at Addiscombe included Sir Frederick Abbott.

== Early career ==
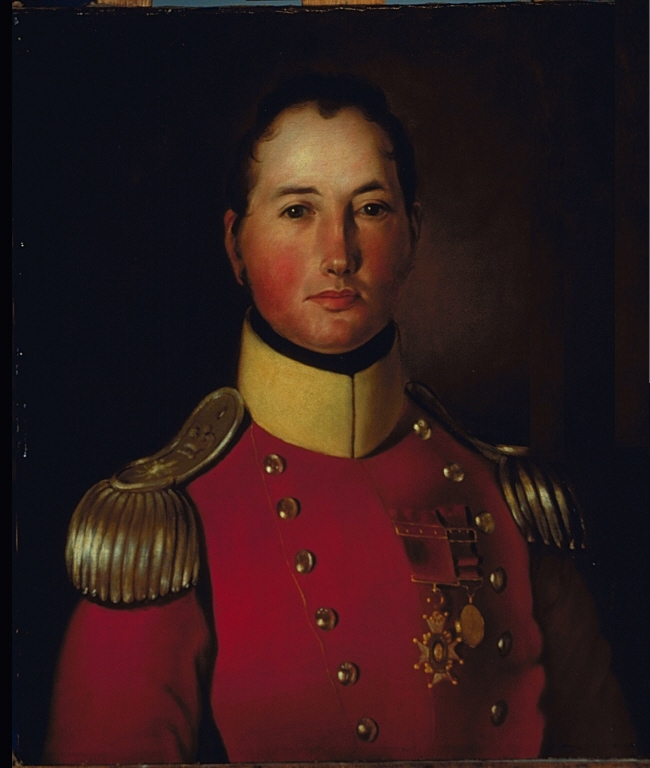
Joseph Wanton Morrison, whom Lawrence served under in the First Anglo-Burmese War

On passing out from Addiscombe in 1822 he was commissioned as a second lieutenant in the Bengal Artillery, arriving in India the following year. He was based at the Calcutta suburb of Dum Dum, where Henry Havelock was also stationed about the same time. He soon saw action in the First Anglo-Burmese War, and at the age of 18 Lawrence commanded a battery forming part of the Chittagong column which General Joseph Wanton Morrison led over the jungle-covered hills of Arakan. He served for two years in Burma, until the expedition was decimated by fever, and Lawrence nearly perished of the illness. He returned to Dum Dum, before being sent first to Penang and then Canton to convalesce. As these changes in climate failed to affect his health for the better, he was invalided back to England. During his furlough in England, he resided with his family in Bristol, where he would first meet his future wife Honoria Marshall, until the opportunity arose in the autumn of 1828 to assist in the trigonometrical survey in Ireland.

Lawrence set sail for India on 2 September 1829 with his brother John, who had recently completed his studies at the East India Company College. The brothers parted company in Calcutta, and Lawrence rejoined his regiment in Karnal on the Sikh frontier, where his elder brother George was now stationed. In 1831 he was transferred to the horse artillery in Cawnpore and the following year he passed examinations in Hindustani and Persian with the aim of earning a civil service posting.

=== Revenue Survey of India ===
In 1833 he was appointed an assistant to the Revenue Survey of India by Lord William Bentinck based at Gorakhpur. He was tasked with mapping out and marking the boundaries of villages and fields in certain large districts, classifying them in accordance with the quality of soil and extent of holdings and to investigate and record the rights of claimants. He soon perceived the urgent need for more canals, and more and better roads, urging that "the farmer, the soldier, the policeman, the traveller, the merchant, all want more roads. Cut roads in every direction." During his time with the Survey, Lawrence was known for his zeal, discouragement of cheating and at times harsh treatment of bribe taking. In 1837, the secretary to the Board of Revenue remarked to the Lieutenant Governor of the North-West Provinces:

Captain Lawrence is one of the most experienced and zealous of the officers employed in the survey, and has conducted the process of double survey more successfully than perhaps any other...Captain Lawrence is prepared to guarantee a complete survey of three thousand square miles per annum when the villages average one square mile each.

Lawrence went on to successfully accomplish this guarantee, and earned the nickname "Gunpowder" from James Thomason for his "explosive force which shattered all obstacles". In 1835 his father died, and as such his military pension also ceased, leaving his mother Letitia penniless. Lawrence, along with his brothers, took on the responsibility of remitting allowances for their mother. In July 1837, his sweetheart Honoria Marshall arrived in Hooghly and they married at the Mission Church in Calcutta on 21 August. Honoria accompanied Lawrence to Gorakpur where she became an enthusiastic assistant in his work. By the close of 1837, Lawrence had completed his work in Gorakpur and set out for Allahabad the next district on his list. He continued with the survey until August 1838 when he was ordered to stand ready to rejoin his troop amid talk of war with Afghanistan.

=== Ferozepore ===
In October 1838, in the run up to the First Anglo-Afghan War, Lawrence departed Allahabad to join Alexander Burnes's Horse Artillery, part of an 'Army of the Indus.' At the time he received an offer of a hundred rupees a month from a Calcutta paper to act as a correspondent during the war, agreeing on the condition of anonymity, that he would not supply any information that was not above board, and that the money would be divided between the Calcutta Orphan Asylum and the Benevolent Institution. When the army was ordered to stand fast, he instead became assistant to Sir George Russell Clerk, adding to his political experience in the management of the district of Ferozepore. At Ferozepore, Lawrence was collector, magistrate, civil and military engineer, universal provider and paymaster to troops that passed through the district. He was called upon to settle a boundary dispute on the British side of the Sutlej, and so impressed where neighbouring chiefs of his sagacity and fairness a number of barons across the border and in the Cis-Sutlej states sought his assistance to settle their own boundary disputes. In June 1839 Maharaja Ranjit Singh died and talk of war with the Sikh Empire began. Lawrence, spent much of the period acquainting himself with knowledge of the history and culture of the Sikh Empire, and penned a romance of the Punjab to aid those who cared to learn more about the region.

=== Peshawar ===
When news of disaster came from Kabul in November 1841 he was at first tasked with pushing up supports for the relief of Sir Robert Sale and the garrison of Jalalabad. He was to prepare the way for a relief force through the four hundred miles between Ferozepur and the Khyber. He requested the assistance of guns from the Sikh authorities, who agreed on the condition of the willingness of the gunners themselves, who at first proved unwilling. He relocated to Peshawar where he was responsible for getting the Sikh allies in hand, and helping to prepare the army of Sir George Pollock. He had hoped to accompany Pollock in the Kabul Expedition in 1842, however his fellow agent Frederick Mackeson was preferred. Instead he was allowed to remain with his old corps until the Khyber Pass was won. At the conclusion of the war, he returned to Ferozepur where the Governor General of India met the armies of Pollock, Sale and Nott.

In January 1843, Lawrence left Ferozepur when he was appointed superintendent of Dehradun. It soon emerged that military officers were barred from this post, and so he was instead transferred to Ambala as the assistant to the envoy at Lahore. Soon after taking charge, he was instructed to lead a military expedition in Khytul and was thereafter ordered to administer the region. Despite his short time in Khytul, Lawrence introduced a number of reforms including reduced taxes, the abolition of forced labour, a prompt system of justice and punishing bribery and corruption. In addition where required he remitted the land tax owed by a cultivator until he could improve his condition, and made the cultivator undertake public works such as digging wells in lieu of payment. Lawrence soon became somewhat disappointed by his lack of recognition for his contribution in the war and constant moving between jobs. Later that year however he was elevated to the rank of Major and appointed to the well-salaried and prestigious post of the Resident of Nepal.

== Resident at Nepal ==
Lawrence arrived in Kathmandu in November 1843, leaving his wife behind as European women were not allowed to enter the Kingdom at that present time. Shortly after arriving, as a gesture of goodwill, Honoria was granted a rare exception to join her husband. During his time in Nepal, under instruction not to interfere in the internal administration of the Kingdom, Lawrence devoted much of his time to literary pursuits, ably assisted by his wife. He wrote a defence of Sir William Macnaghten which included passages foreshadowing the later mutiny of 1857, in which he lamented the blind self-confidence of British policy in India, the unpreparedness for disaffection, a lack of supplies, and the weakness of British garrisons. He also became a contributor to the Calcutta Review edited by Sir John Kaye. In an article titled the Military Defence of our Indian Empire, he insisted on the need for the Government to be ready for war at all times, a view which was challenged by his editor. It was whilst in Kathmandu that Lawrence and his wife first proposed the idea of homes in the cooler hills for the children of serving British officers.

== Punjab ==
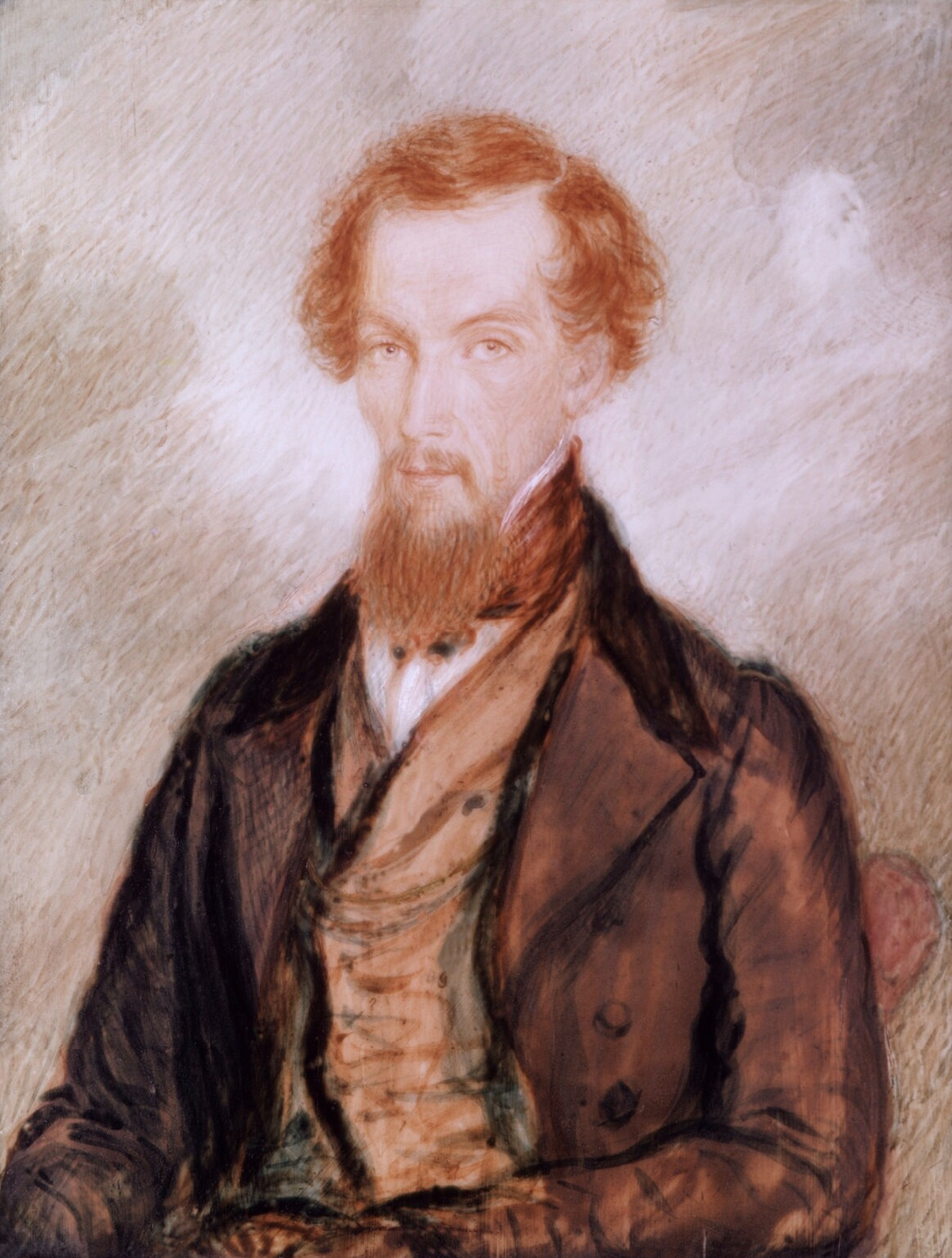
c. 1847 portrait of Lawrence

In 1845, instability in the Sikh Empire led to growing tensions with neighbouring provinces. Lawrence's articles in the Calcutta Review had caught the attention of Henry Hardinge, the new Governor-General of India, who was impressed by his knowledge of the region. Hardinge appointed Lawrence as his political assistant following the death of Major George Broadfoot at the start of the First Anglo-Sikh War. He was present at the decisive Battle of Sobraon which brought the war to a conclusion. As political agent, he responded to allegations that leading Sikh chiefs had betrayed their countrymen at Sobraon and sold the battle to the British, denying any knowledge of treachery on the part of the Sikh chiefs and interference by British officials.

=== Lahore Durbar ===
Following Sobraon, Lawrence counselled the Governor-General not to annex the Punjab but instead reconstruct the Sikh Empire, fenced in and fortified by British bayonets. This was provided for in the Treaty of Lahore, whereby a British garrison was to be based in Lahore to further this purpose. Lawrence spent the next three months as the agent in Lahore. In his diaries, Lawrence would later write of his intentions in his role:

"The basis of our arrangements, however, was: first, the reduction of the army to the lowest number required to defend the frontier and preserve internal peace, and to pay that army punctually; second, to strike off the most obnoxious taxes and, as far as possible, equalise and moderate the assessment of the country and insure what was collected reaching the public treasury; thirdly to have a very simple code of laws, founded on the Sikh customs, reduced to writing and administered by the most respectable men from their own ranks."

During this time, he assisted in the sale of Kashmir to Gulab Singh, the Raja of Jammu as war indemnity, a move which caused considerable unrest in Lahore. When a rebellion broke out, presumed to have been instigated by Lal Singh in support of the existing Sikh governor, Lawrence personally accompanied a body of Sikh troops to Kashmir in support of Gulab Singh. Through his support of Gulab Singh, Lawrence was able to wield significant power over the new Maharajah of Jammu and Kashmir, inducing the leader to abolish sati, female infanticide and child slavery throughout his dominions, and attracting considerable financial support for his later philanthropic endeavours.

The terms of the initial treaty had permitted British troops to remain until the end of 1846. However at the request of the Lahore Durbar that troops remain until the new Maharajah reached 16, the Treaty of Bhairowal was signed. A key condition of the Treaty was that a Resident British officer, with an efficient establishment of assistants, was to be appointed by the Governor-General to remain at Lahore, with "full authority to direct and control all matters in every Department of the State. Maulvi Sayed Rajab Ali of Jagraon (Ludhiana Dist) a close confidant of Sir Henry Lawrence played an important role in these negotiations". Lawrence was appointed to the role of Resident, and began assembling a team of officer assistants, who would become known as Henry Lawrence's "Young Men".

=== Interlude ===
In 1848, following a year of relative peace in the Punjab, Lawrence was granted sick leave and accompanied Henry Hardinge to England where he was made a Knight Commander of the Bath on Hardinge's recommendation. In March, Lawrence was officially replaced as the British Resident at Lahore by Sir Frederick Currie. The murder of two of his assistants, Patrick Vans Agnew and W. A. Anderson in Multan, and the outbreak of the Second Anglo-Sikh War hastened his return to India. He was present at the Battle of Chillianwala, and although lacking an official capacity, he played a key role in persuading Lord Gough not to withdraw his troops after the battle. The war was won by the East India Company and the Punjab became a province of the Bengal Presidency.

=== Board of Administration ===
Despite not supporting the British annexation of the Punjab in 1849, he served as the President of the Board of Administration from 1849–53. The new Punjab province was to be administered under the superintendence of a Board of Administration and Lawrence was made its president. He was assisted on the Board by his brother John and Charles Grenville Mansel, under whom he retained his troop of hand picked assistants. As President, Lawrence travelled extensively in the province, each year travelling three or four months, each day riding usually thirty to forty miles. At each station he would visit public offices, gaols, bazaars, receive visitors of all ranks, inspect the Punjab regiments and police, and receive daily petitions sometimes numbering in the hundreds. In his diary he noted that under his administration they had raised five regiments of fine cavalry and infantry, six regiments of very good military police and 2,700 cavalry police, planted thousands of trees, ensured serais were ever-present on main roads, police posts every two or three miles, and steps were taken in education.

Despite the success of the Board of Administration, internal tensions had arisen and the new Governor General, Lord Dalhousie, preferred to invest power in the hands of single administrator. Part of the reason for this was Lawrence's insistence on compensating the Sikh nobility and aristocracy who had suffered ruin following defeat in the Second Anglo-Sikh War. Lawrence, mindful of the potential for discontent to be sewn by disgruntled aristocrats, liberally offered financial assistance, a policy opposed by both his brother John and Dalhousie Both Lawrence and his brother John tendered their resignation, however Dalhousie chose John as his new Lieutenant-Governor. Dalhousie explained his decision by stating that after some years of military administration in the Punjab, there was now a need for a civil administration to which John Lawrence would be more suited. The decision deeply hurt Henry who felt he had proved his self-taught civil administrative abilities over the course of the previous twenty years.

== Oude and Rajputana ==
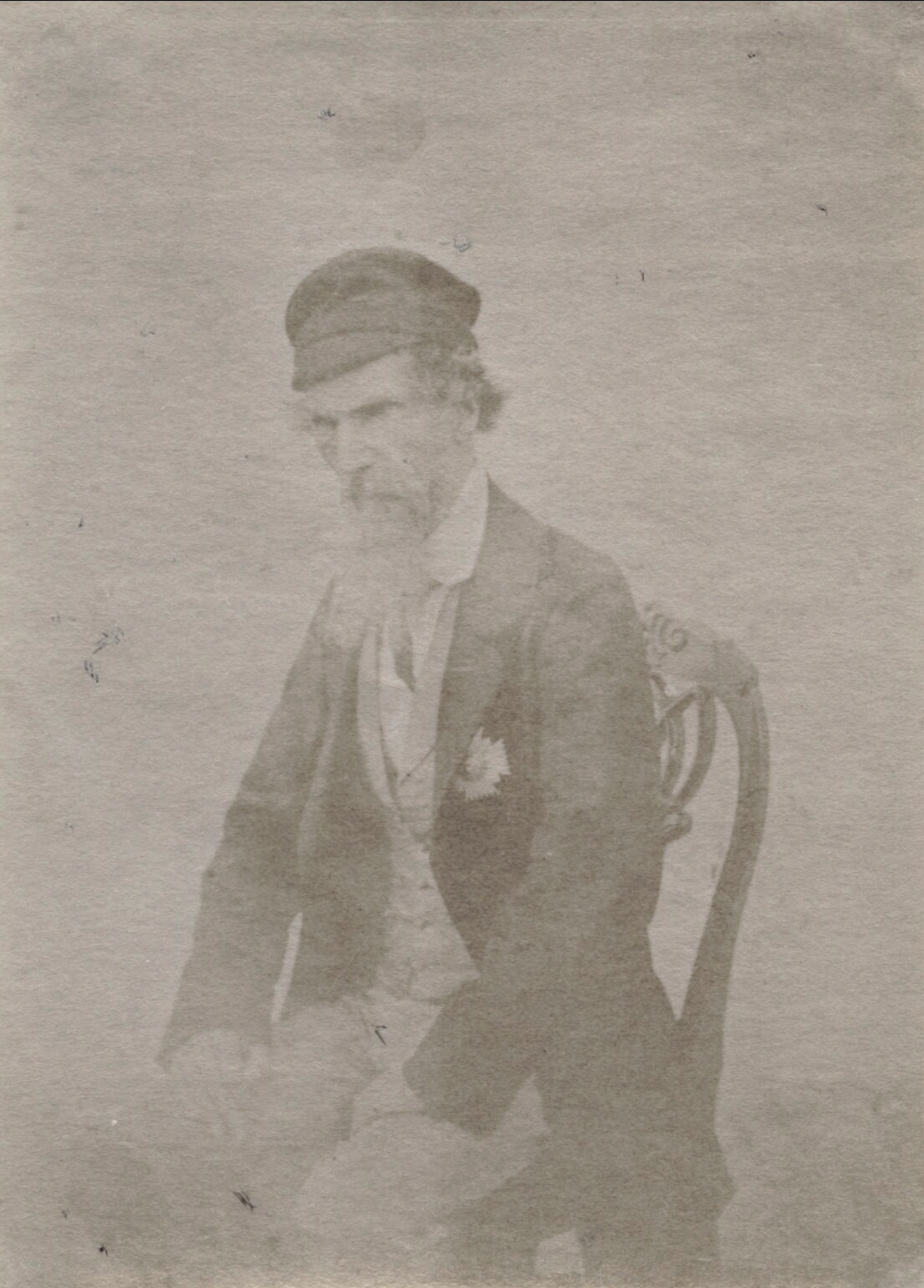
c. 1857 photograph of Lawrence

Lawrence began his new role as the Governor-General's Agent in Rajputana in 1853. Much of his energy was devoted to two principal causes, the abolition of widow-burning in Rajputana and reforming the prison system. Whilst in Rajputana his wife Honoria died and his health began to fail, prompting first a desire to succeed Sir James Outram as Resident at Lucknow, for which he was overlooked for a civilian, and thereafter a desire to undertake leave to England.

In 1856, Oudh had been annexed by the East India Company on the grounds of internal maladministration. The following March, Lawrence was appointed to the prestigious post of Chief Commissioner of Oudh. Under his predecessor Colville Coverley Jackson, much of the local aristocracy had fallen from grace and widespread unrest had come to the fore. An added concern was growing discontent amongst the Sepoys of the Bengal Army, a large proportion of whom were drawn from Oudh, and thus able to command support in the province. Lawrence had long taken an interest in the sepoy army, noting its defects, and advising successive Governor-Generals of the need to listen to concerns of the soldiery and implement reform, and as such was wary that any insurrection amongst the sepoys could instigate a wider civil unrest.

== Siege of Lucknow ==
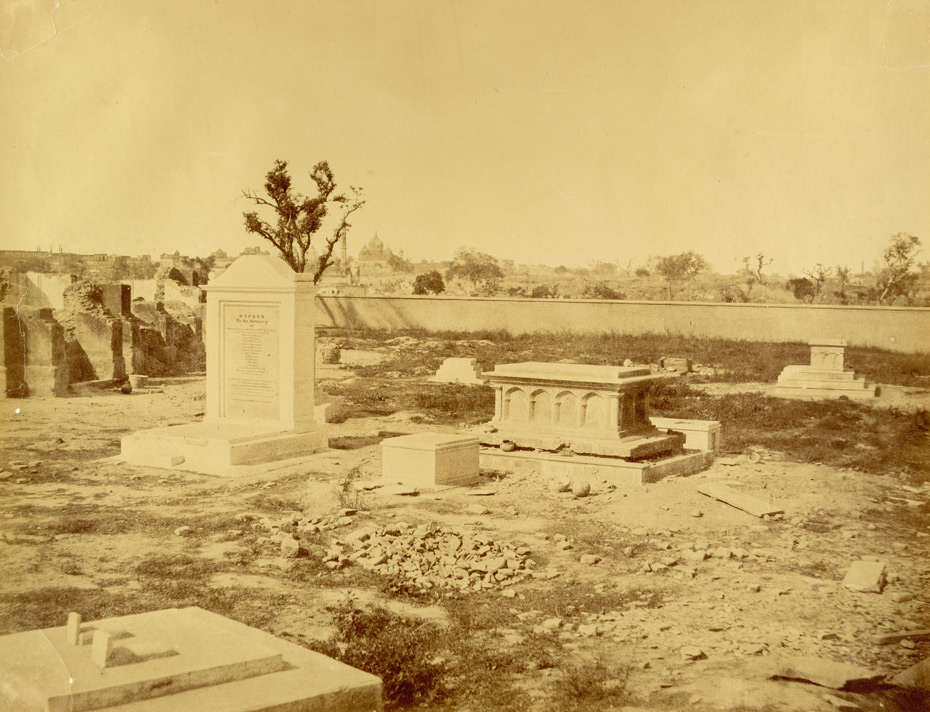
Graves of General Neill and others (left) and Lawrence's tomb (right) at the Residency, Lucknow

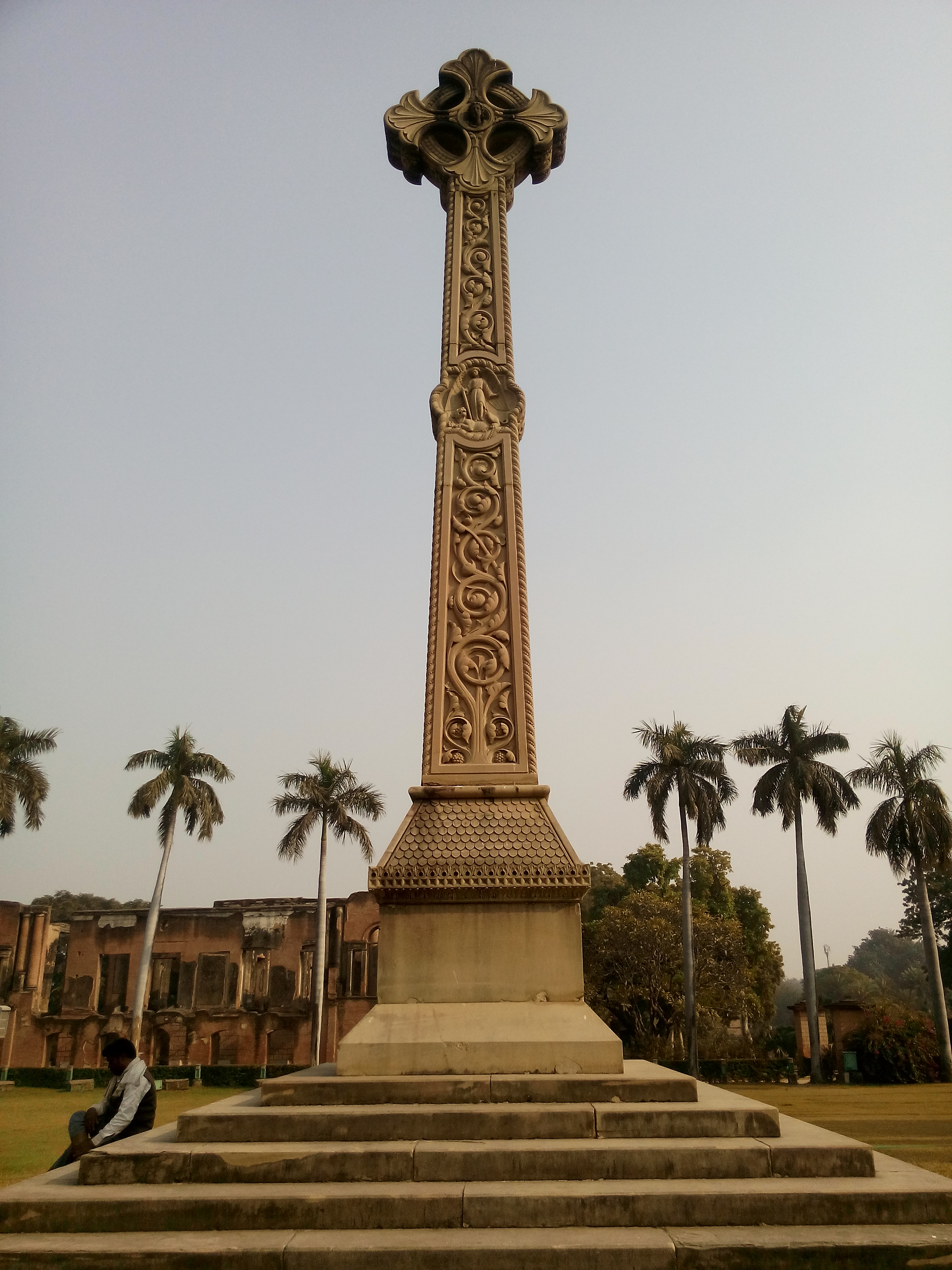
High cross memorial to Lawrence at the Residency, Lucknow

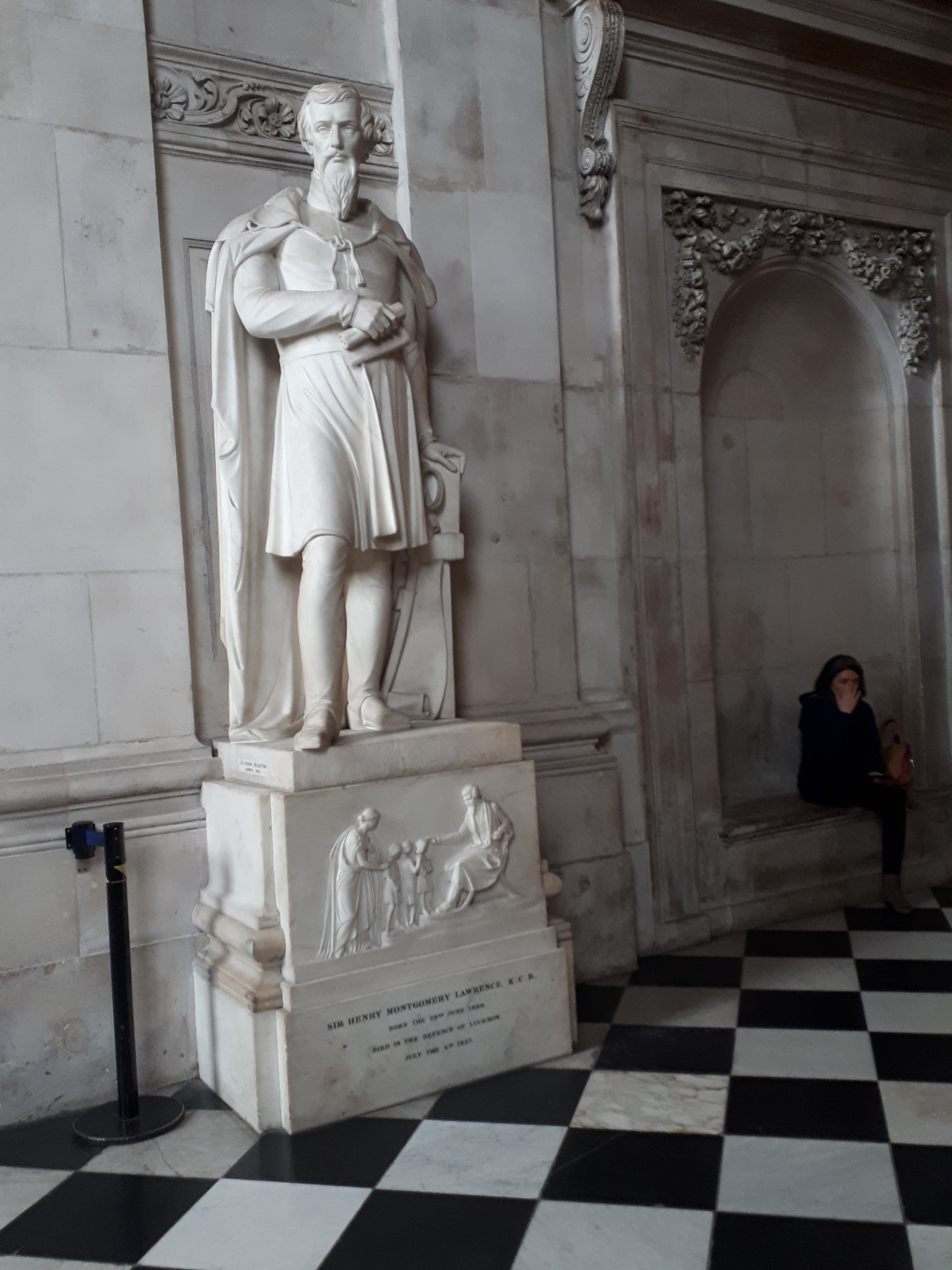
Memorial to Lawrence in St Paul's Cathedral, London

In May 1857, two months after assuming his post in Oudh, the Indian Rebellion of 1857 commenced. Lawrence earned praise for the prompt and decisive handling of an insurrection of an irregular native regiment near Lucknow, and was in turn awarded full military and civil authority by the Governor-General, Lord Canning. He arranged for a garrison in Lucknow of some 1700 men, and took refuge in the British residency. Such was his assured handling of the crisis, that the British government and Board of Directors of the East India Company found it necessary to nominate him as provisional Governor-General of India in the event of the death or resignation of Lord Canning.

On the morning of 30 June, despite being weak and exhausted with illness, he led a march towards Nawabgunj to confront some mutinous regiments approaching Lucknow. Around six or seven miles from Lucknow he encountered 15,000 soldiers with thirty guns. Soon after, the artillery of the Oude irregular force deserted his command, joining the mutineers. Significantly outnumbered Lawrence was forced into a retreat, suffering heavy losses. On their return, the Residency was soon besieged by mutineers and the Siege of Lucknow commenced. On 1 July, a shell burst into his quarters in the upper part of the Residency. Despite pleas from his officers, he refused to move his quarters to a safer area. The following day, whilst lying on a couch, a shell burst beside him and shattered his thigh. Dr Joseph Fayrer was summoned to provide consultation, and decided that amputation would only increase his suffering, and was likely to shorten his life. Fayrer gave him three days to live. Lawrence lingered until the second day, and died at approximately eight in the morning on 4 July 1857.

He was buried that same evening in a soldier's grave, and it is said that not a single officer saw the lowering of his body into the ground so furious was the fighting raging at the time. When Lawrence was critically injured and aware he was dying, he gave final orders to his nominated successor at Lucknow, Major John Banks, who immediately recorded them in writing. The twelfth among his fourteen directions was "Put on my tomb only this; Here lies Henry Lawrence who tried to do his duty." This epitaph appears on his tombstone at the Residency graveyard.

== Educational institutions ==
Lawrence established institutions for the education of the children of British soldiers, known as the Lawrence Military Asylums, at four places in British India. Three of these institutions survive today as the prestigious Lawrence School, Sanawar (HP, India), Lawrence School, Lovedale (TN, India) and Lawrence College, Ghora Gali (Murree, Pakistan): the fourth, which does not survive, was at Mount Abu, in present-day Rajasthan.

Following the Disruption of 1843, along with Sir James Outram, Lawrence supported Reverend Alexander Duff in establishing the Free Church Institution in Calcutta, as a rival institution to the General Assembly's Institution, which had been founded by Duff in 1830. These two institutions would later be merged to form the Scottish Churches College, known since 1929 (when the Church of Scotland was unified) as Scottish Church College.

== Family life ==
Lawrence married Honoria Marshall at St. John's Church, Calcutta, on 21 August 1837. They had four children. In 1858, his eldest son Alexander was created 1st Baronet Lawrence, of Lucknow, in consideration of his father's services.

== Works ==
- Lawrence, H. M. L. (1845). Adventures of an Officer in the Service of Runjeet Singh. London: Henry Colburn.
- Lawrence, Henry Montgomery (1859). Essays, Military and Political, Written in India. London: W. H. Allen & Co.
- Lawrence also contributed to the Calcutta Review.

== Commemoration ==
Lawrence is commemorated by a high cross in the cemetery adjacent to the Residency in Lucknow. There is a monument to him by J. G. Lough in the south transept of St Paul's Cathedral in London and a memorial by J. H. Foley at St. Paul's Cathedral in Calcutta. There is a portrait of him in the dining room of the East India Club in London.

He is also remembered in the names of:

- Henry Lawrence Island in the Indian Ocean, at 12N 93E.
- The town of Lawrence in New Zealand.
- The Lawrence Arms public house in Southsea, Hampshire.
