= Lawrence College Ghora Gali =

Educational institute in Murree, Pakistan

Lawrence College, Ghora Gali
- کالج لارنس، گھوڑا گلی

Location
- Ghora Gali, Murree, Punjab; Pakistan; 33°53′15″N 73°22′11″E

Information
- Type: Nonstate Boarding School
- Motto: Never Give In
- Established: 1860
- Founder: Sir Henry Montgomery Lawrence
- Principal: Brig (R) Jawad Ahmed Zaka SI (M)
- Enrollment: 750 (approx.)
- Area: 40 hectares (100 acres)
- Affiliation: BISE RWP; GCSE
- Website: www.lawrencecollege.edu.pk

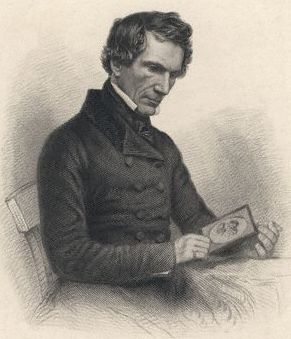
Sir Sir Henry Lawrence KCB (28 June 1806 – 4 July 1857)

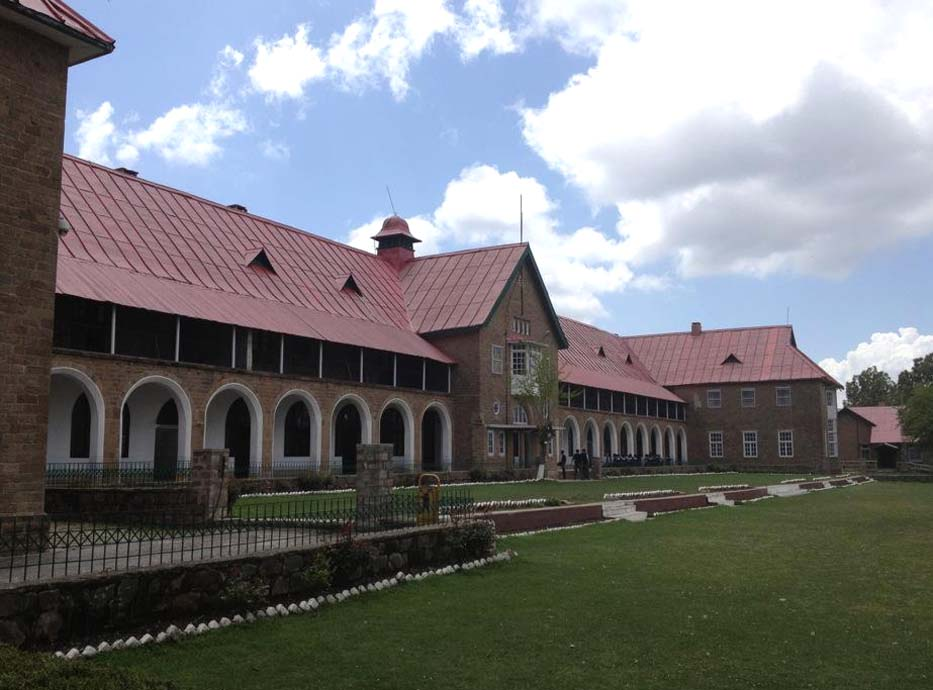
Main building of the school

Lawrence College, Ghora Gali (Urdu: گھوڑا گلی، مری) is a boys boarding school located in the Murree Hills, Punjab, Pakistan. Established in 1860 and named after Sir Henry Lawrence, the first administrator of British Punjab, it is one of the oldest residential educational institutions in Pakistan. The school follows a public school model influenced by British colonial-era institutions and provides education from primary to higher secondary levels.

The college is located in the foothills of the Himalayas and Pir Panjal at a height of about 1950 metres (6395 feet) above sea level, covering an area of 40 hectares (100 acres). It is 4 km from Murree and 57 km from Rawalpindi/Islamabad.

== History ==
The college was founded in 1860 for the orphans of British soldiers and was named after Sir Henry Lawrence.

== Notable alumni ==
- Shahid Khaqan Abbasi, former Prime Minister of Pakistan
- Ayaz Amir
- Mumtaz Bhutto
- Sarfraz Bugti
- Reginald Dyer
- Ismail Gulgee
- Usman Ali Isani, educationist
- Jamal Nazrul Islam
- Zafarullah Khan Jamali, former Prime Minister Of Pakistan
- Bilal Abbas Khan, actor
- Lt. Gen. Imran Ullah Khan
- Raja Muhammad Zulqarnain Khan, former President of Azad Kashmir
- Gen. Shamim Alam Khan
- Ikram Sehgal
- V/Adm. Kaleem Shaukat
- Aftab Ahmad Khan Sherpao

== See also ==
- Army Burn Hall College
- Lawrence Military Asylums
- Lawrence School, Lovedale
- Lawrence School, Sanawar
