= Satjiv S. Chahil =

American business executive

Satjiv Singh Chahil
- Born: October 19, 1950 (age 76); Amritsar, India
- Occupation: Business executive

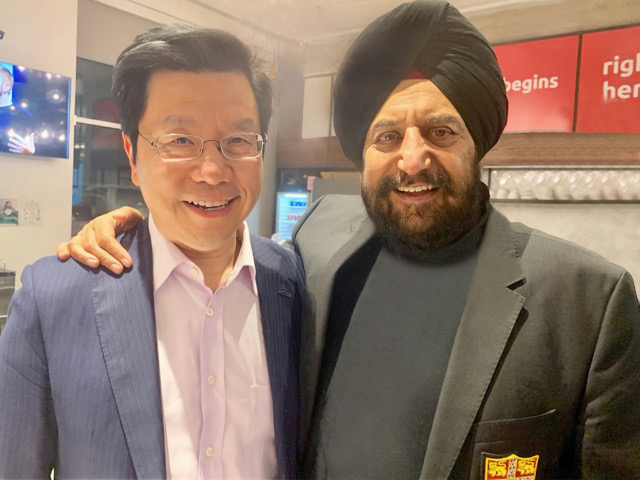
Kai-Fu Lee and Satjiv Chahil at DISRUPT SF 2018

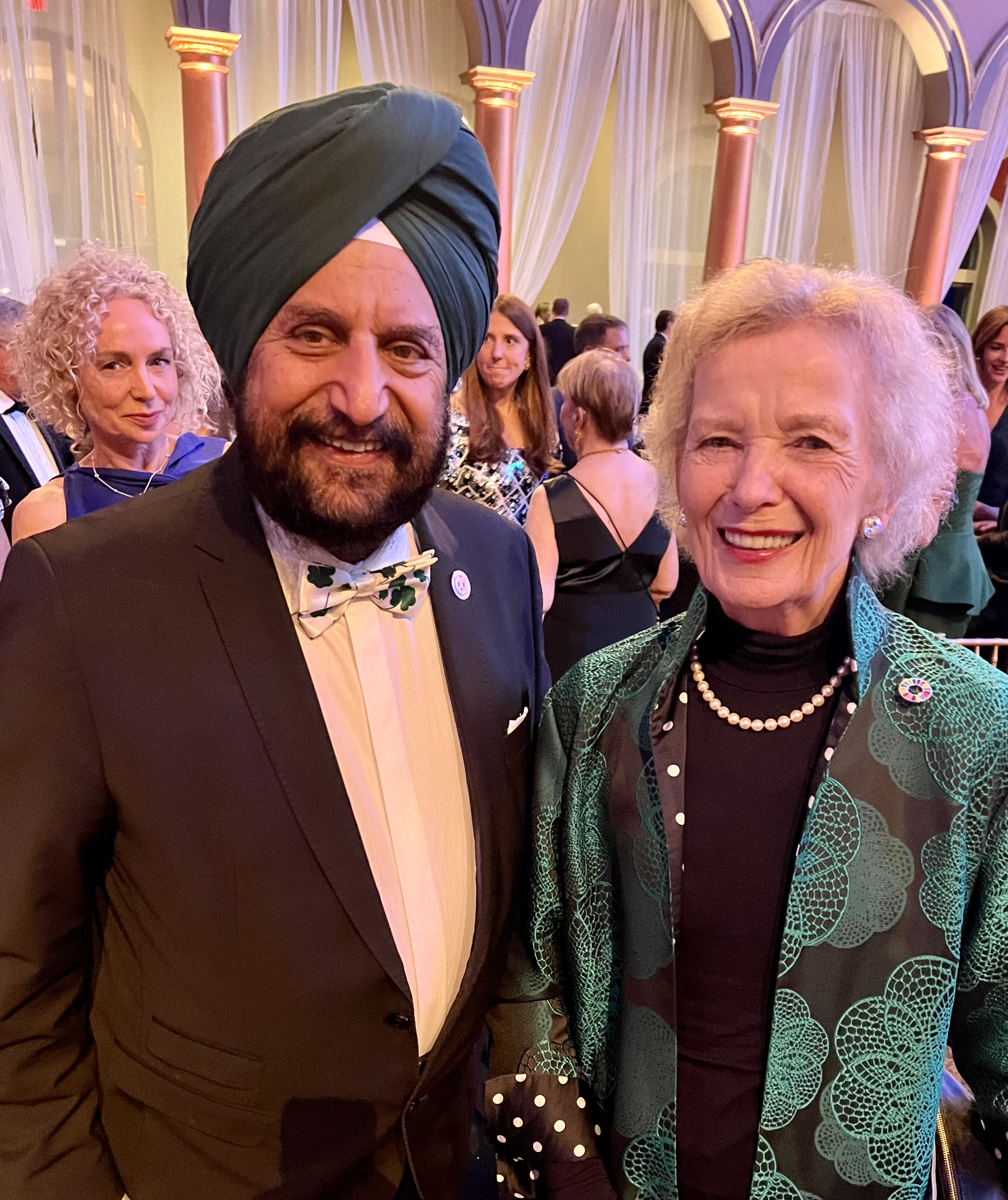
Mary Robinson and Satjiv Chahil at Ireland Funds Gala March 2023

Satjiv Singh Chahil (born October 19, 1950) is an Indian-American business executive. He has held executive roles at Apple Inc., IBM and HP Inc.

== Early life and education ==
Chahil was born in Amritsar, India on October 19, 1950 to Pritam Singh Chahil (father) and Champa Chahil (née Dugal) (mother). Pritam Singh was a member of the Indian hockey contingent at the 1936 Summer Olympics in Berlin. He was a publisher, public service worker, and an educationist. He also initiated and funded the development of the first automatic Punjabi language typesetting machine. Pritam Singh is recognized for his Roman alphabet English language transliteration of the entire Sri Guru Granth Sahib. Chahil studied at The Lawrence School, Sanawar, India, earning the Indian School Certificate (administered by the University of Cambridge) in 1967. He graduated from Punjab University, Chandigarh, India in 1971 with a Bachelor of Commerce degree. Chahil went on to earn a master's degree from the Thunderbird School of Global Management in 1976.

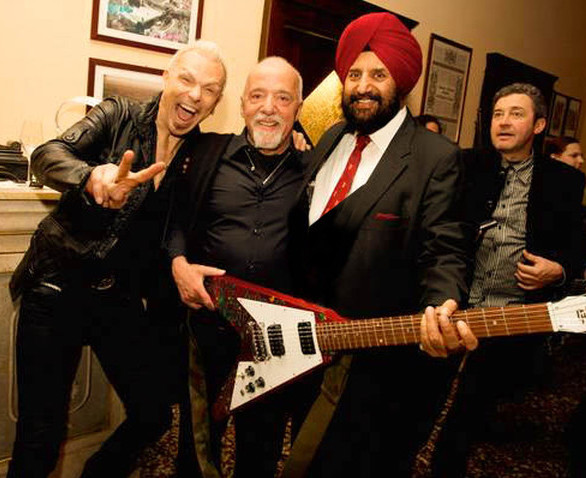
Paulo Coelho, The Scorpions, and Satjiv Chahil; Bassano del Grappa, Italy; April 2012

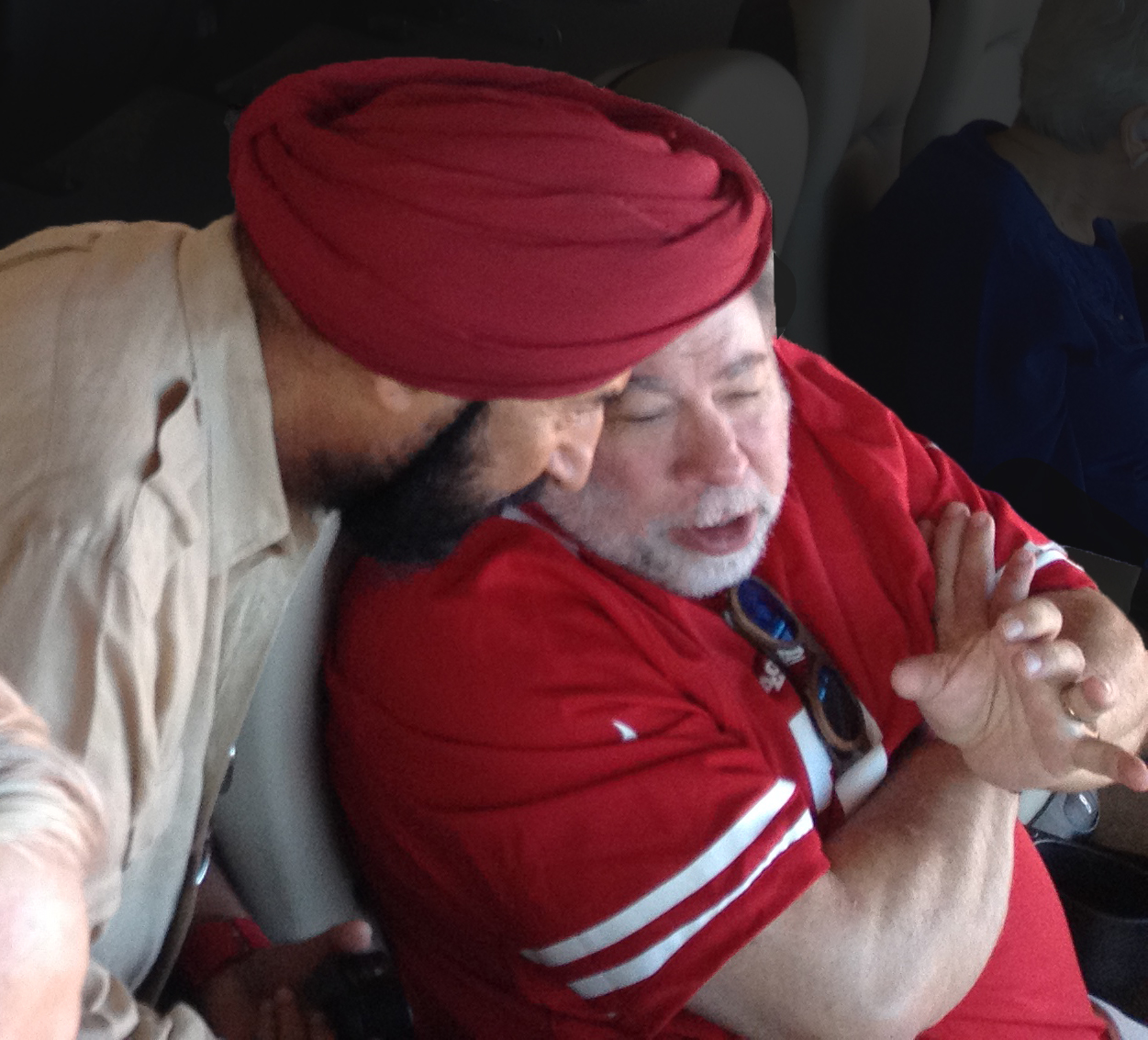
Satjiv Chahil with Woz

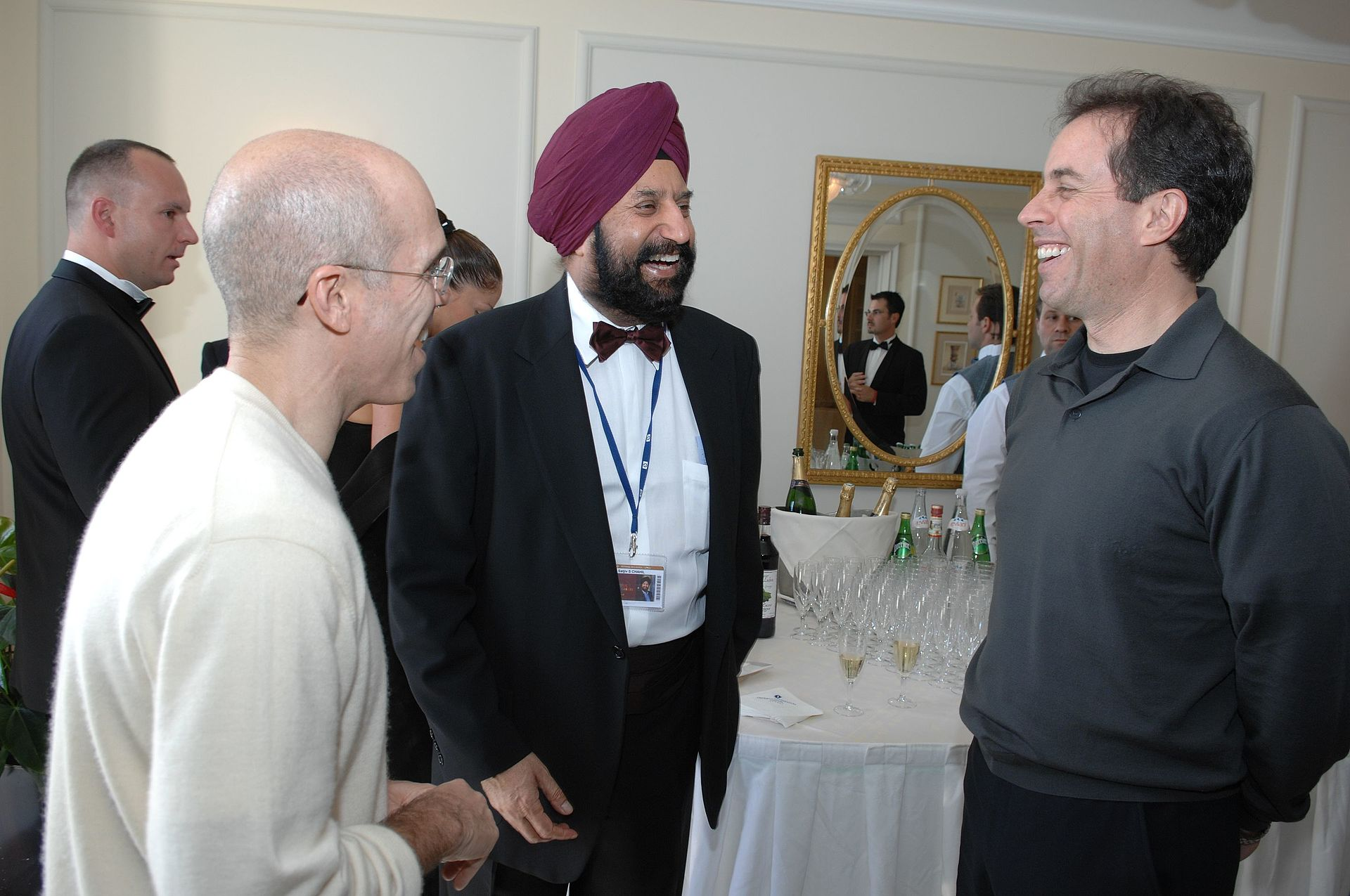
Jerry Seinfeld Satjiv Chahil

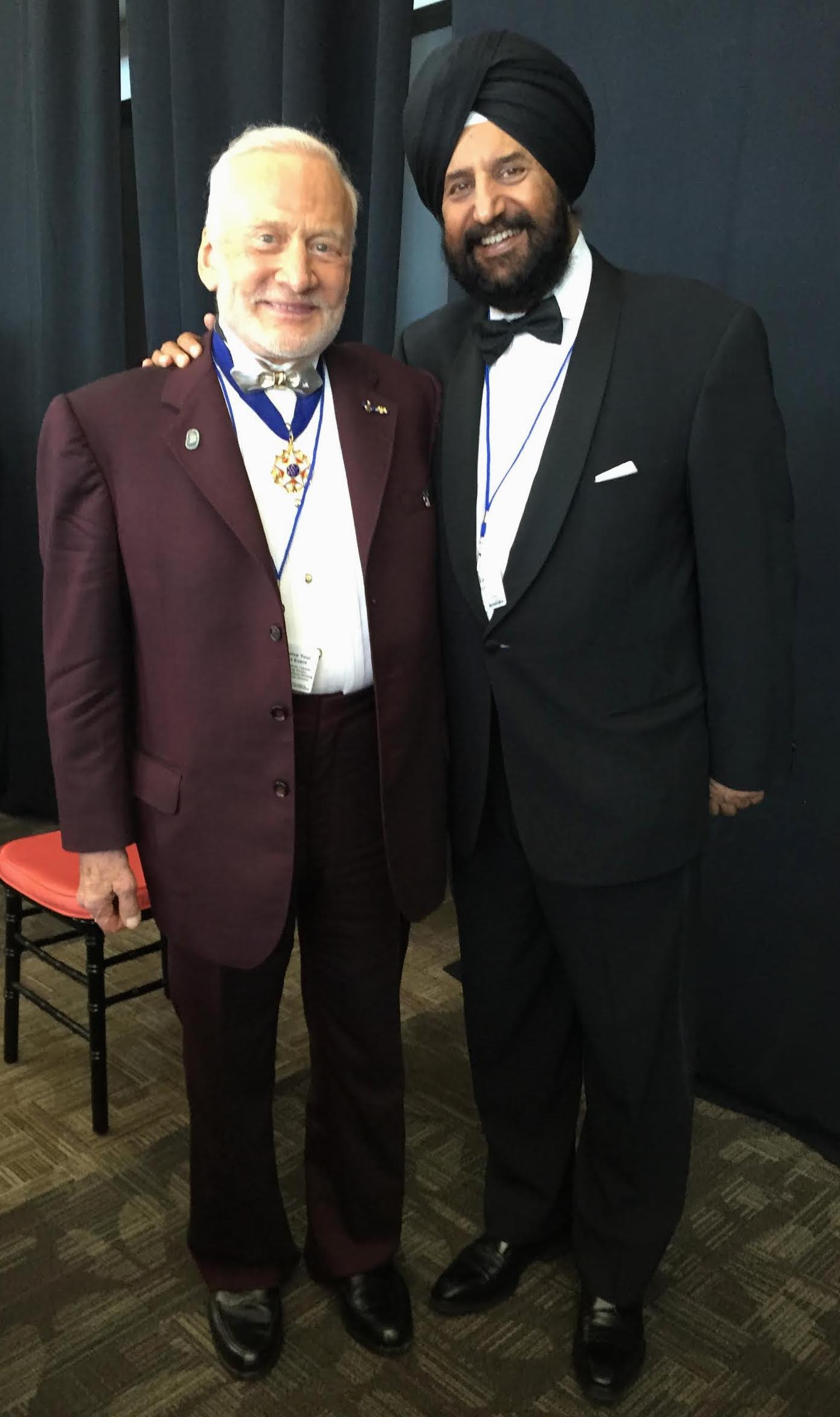
Buzz Aldrin with Satjiv Chahil; Starkey Hearing Foundation event, St. Paul, July 2016

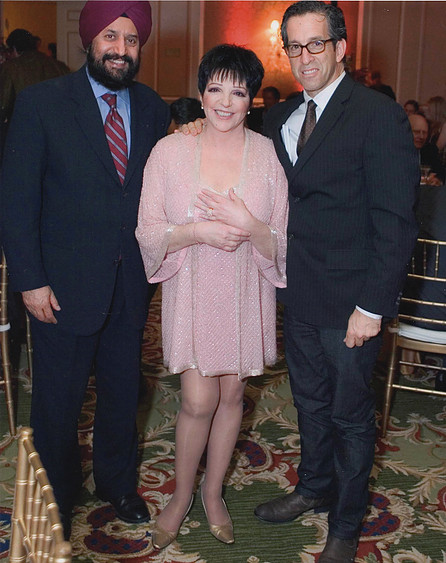
Liza Minnelli and Kenneth Cole at amfAR

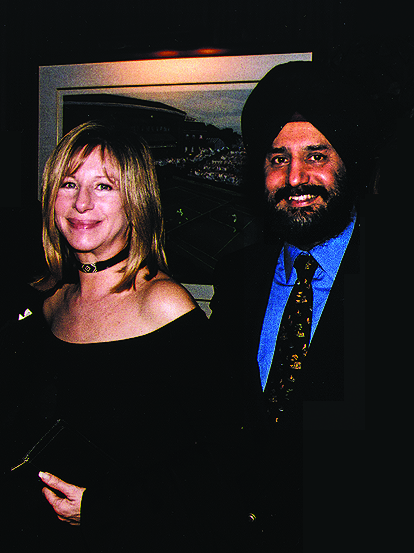
Barbra Streisand Satjiv 08

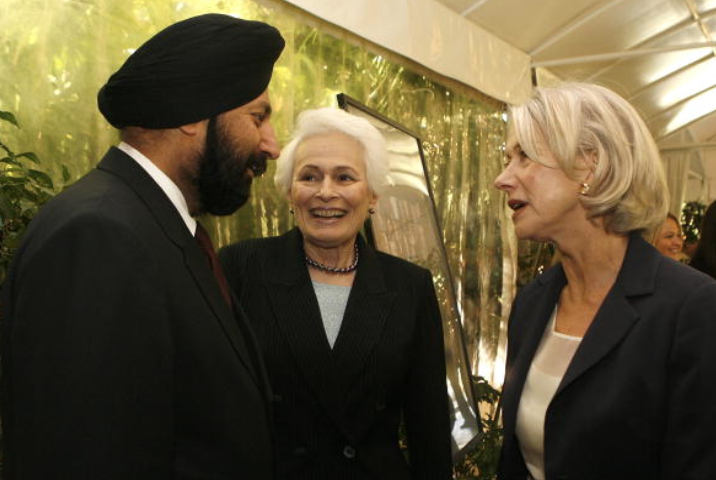
Jean Picker Firstenberg + Helen Mirren

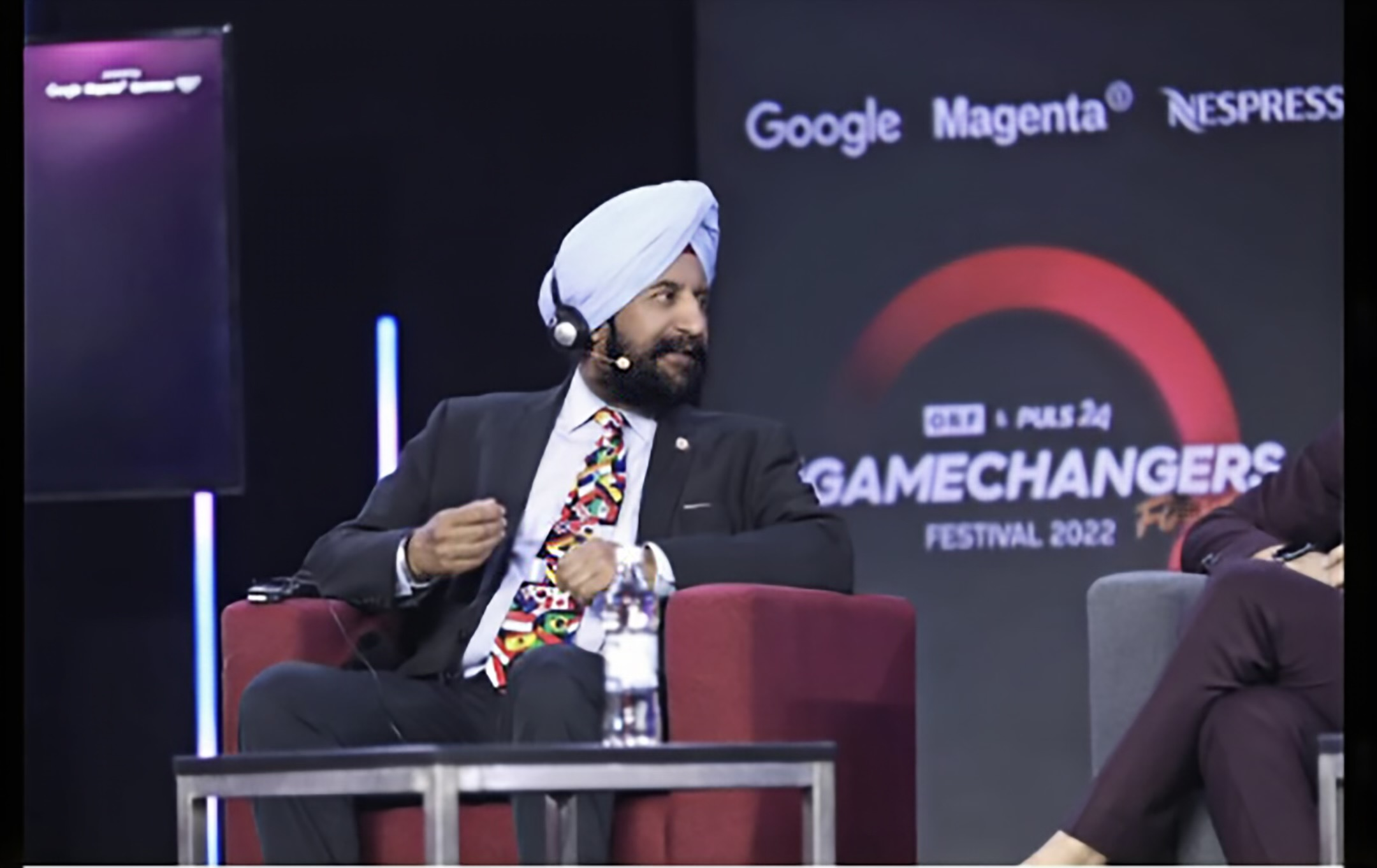
Gamechangers Vienna 2022

== Career ==
From September 1988 to April 1997, Chahil served in various capacities at Apple Inc, including Senior Vice President of Worldwide Marketing and Founding General Manager of the New Media, Internet and Entertainment division. Later, he was responsible for Worldwide Marketing and Corporate Communications. Chahil initiated the incorporation of multimedia (Quicktime video and audio technologies and CD ROMs) into personal computers. He also collaborated with Toshiba and Warner Bros. to create the DVD standard and authoring tools.

Chahil developed the Apple partnership with the American Film Institute, which led to alliances with Paramount Pictures and Tom Cruise for Mission: Impossible (film). He entered into alliances with recording artists, including Peter Gabriel and Herbie Hancock, and auto brands BMW and Audi. He partnered with existing customers from the creative communities for Webcasting, audio/video downloads/streaming and enhanced CDs. In 1995, Chahil played a key role in forging an alliance between Apple and Abbey Road Studios, where the Beatles did most of their recordings. This was the first major tie-up struck between the computer industry and the world of entertainment. In 1996, he organized the world's first Webcast at the Grammy Awards.

In 1992, he organized the Hakone forum in Japan, which brought together experts from business and academia, representing computing, publishing, film and television, to set the multimedia agenda for the first time. In 1993, Chahil entered into an alliance with the LPGA of Japan Tour, one of the earliest initiatives by a technology company to acknowledge women as consumers. In 1996, he also initiated actions to make the computer more friendly to children.

Chahil began his career at IBM in 1976. He played a role in the introduction of the first Automated Teller Machines, and in the adoption and spread of barcode technologies. From 1979 to 1988, Chahil worked at Xerox. At Xerox Palo Alto, as General Manager of the Strategic Business Unit for multilingual workstations, he played a key role in the acceptance of the Unicode standard, the software developed by Joe Becker, which became the basis of foreign language computing. From 1997 to 1999, Chahil was Advisor on digital convergence to the top management at Sony. He helped establish the Vaio line of laptop computers.

In 1999, Chahil took up the role of Chief Marketing Officer of Newbridge Networks to reposition and create adoption of a new innovative broadband infrastructure technology. After the technology was accepted, Newbridge Networks was acquired by Alcatel in 2000. Soon after, Chahil joined Palm Inc. as Chief Marketing Officer, and played a role in organizing the company's IPO. He also drove the creation of a new paradigm for mobile computing, and during his tenure, Palm grew to become the highest-ranking mobile brand, after Nokia. To spread the benefits of the new technology, Chahil created a marketing partnership with Claudia Schiffer to launch a handheld computer, designed especially for the multi-tasking woman. He also helped to create a new Mobile Memory Standard (SD – Secure Digital), in partnership with Panasonic. In 2002, Chahil was appointed to the Board of PalmSource, the Palm OS company, which was later acquired by Access Systems Americas. Also in 2002, Chahil became chairman and co-founder of Mobile Digital Media (MDM), later renamed Quickoffice, a business that was subsequently acquired by Google.

In the early 1990s, recognizing America's shortage of engineers amid competition from Japanese technology, Chahil proposed tapping into India's vast pool of engineering talent to fuel America's digital revolution and restore its global leadership. In 1994, he facilitated an unprecedented meeting between Apple CEO Michael Spindler and Indian Prime Minister P. V. Narasimha Rao, alongside Finance Minister and later Prime Minister Manmohan Singh, marking a new chapter in U.S.-India tech collaboration. Subsequently, Chahil and his peers worked with President Bill Clinton's administration to expand the H-1B visa program to bring Indian engineers to the United States, and then successfully lobbied to preserve the program when it came under threat during George W. Bush's presidency.

In 2005, while serving as Advisor to BMW, along with Christoph Loch and Markus Seidel, he co-authored an INSEAD paper outlining transformations in the automotive industry, and the emerging convergence between the autobahn and the infobahn.

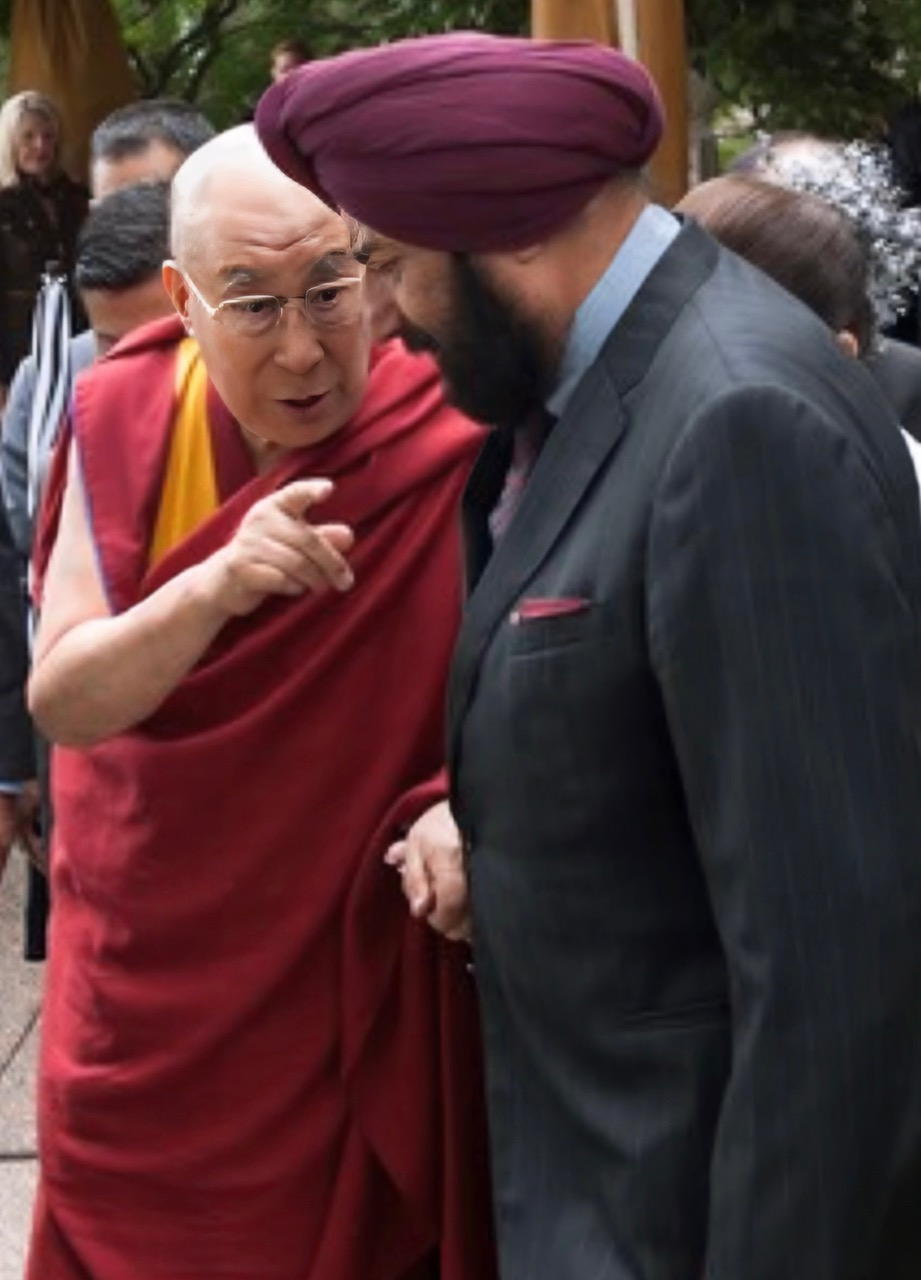
Starkey Foundation function, June 2017 His Holiness Dalai Llama with Satjiv Chahil

Later that year, Chahil joined Hewlett-Packard as Senior Vice President Global Marketing and head of marketing of the Personal Systems Group, and as Head of Small/Medium Business segment for the whole company. During his tenure, HP moved to the top spot in the global PC market. He initiated a resurgence campaign under the banner "The Computer is Personal Again", in partnership with Jay-Z, Jerry Seinfeld, Vivienne Tam, Paulo Coelho and Serena Williams. In October 2009, Chahil established an alliance between HP and Jimmy Iovine and Dr. Dre to release Beats by Dr. Dre with HP Envy limited edition laptops. In December 2012, Chahil played a role in a technology partnership between Sony and the San Francisco 49ers, to create a new standard of stadium and fan experience. As part of this initiative, Sony's high-definition 4K cameras will be placed around the new football stadium at Santa Clara, California and will offer fans with smartphones or tablets access to multiple vantage points and close-ups.

Chahil served on the Millennium Council of the American Film Institute. He has ties to the creative communities in the publishing, advertising, film and music industries. He has been a featured speaker at global technology conferences, as well as at Harvard University, Stanford University, INSEAD and the Sorbonne. Chahil has been a member of the Clinton Global Initiative from its inception.

He serves as a Trustee of the American India Foundation. He has played a hands-on role in the Digital Equalizer Program and other social and women's empowerment initiatives in Punjab, India. Chahil is a member of the board of Cinequest, the organizers of the Cinequest Film Festival in Silicon Valley.

In January 2014, Chahil delivered a keynote address at the Innovex 2014 at Tel Aviv, Israel and spoke about his personal experiences with failures and successes in innovation. In March 2014, Chahil addressed the Techonomy leadership at their San Francisco conclave and spoke about the impact of technology on society and culture. In July 2014, at the opening session of the Silicon Valley Innovation Summit, Chahil remarked that the world is not flat after all. Sharing his learnings from his experience with the American India Foundation, he cautioned entrepreneurs that large social, gender, infrastructure and culture divides needed to be addressed in tandem to help bridge the digital divide, and advised them to innovate in all these areas to effectively meet the needs of humanity. In December 2014, Chahil called on every non-resident Indian in the world to adopt and develop one village each and transform it into a model village, helping thus to strengthen nation-building in India. In September 2015, Chahil delivered the keynote address at the Service Plan for Innovation in Munich, Germany. In his talk entitled "Market-Making - a Silicon Valley Perspective", he called upon all marketing companies to open innovation centers in Silicon Valley. In 2015, Chahil joined Starkey Hearing Technologies as Global Marketing and Innovations Advisor. Along with former Presidents George W. Bush and Bill Clinton, he was a keynote speaker at the 2016 Hearing Innovation Expo. Speaking on industry trends, Chahil said the next trend of wearables will be "ear-worn", and predicted that the rise of "hearables" was imminent. In 2016, Chahil also facilitated a partnership between Starkey and Bragi that enables the development of new products that help overcome the stigma of hearing aids and convert them into attributes of better health. At the Hermes Future Forum in 2016, he encouraged European business leaders to open not just technology centers in Silicon Valley, but to develop their marketing and business strategies from there as well, in order to inculcate a Silicon Valley mindset. At the 2017 European Forum in Alpbach, Austria, Chahil encouraged European business owners to realize the strategic opportunities that lay in uniting across national borders, and to adopt a new business outlook that was based not only on reviewing revenues and profits but also on regularly studying how technologies and digital applications developed halfway across the world could unexpectedly affect or even disrupt their companies. In April 2018, speaking at the inaugural edition of If So, What?, Chahil referred to Silicon Valley as the modern equivalent of Florence during the Renaissance. In July 2018, while speaking at the European thought leader forum Les Napoleons at Arles, France, Chahil called on the French President Emmanuel Macron to build a "digital" Golden Gate Bridge between Silicon Valley and France. The French publication Paris Match, in a cover story on Multimedia, described Chahil as "the premier man of multimedia…someone in between the game-hero Super Mario and Leonardo da Vinci…like a character out of a Jules Verne novel…his preoccupation is not like the regular Silicon Valley millionaires, but is of a humanist concerned about the education of people and the world."

== Personal life ==
He lives in Los Altos, California.
