= Lawrence Military Asylums =

The Lawrence Military Asylums were a series of military-style boarding schools envisaged by Sir Henry Lawrence in the Indian subcontinent highlands for the sons and daughters of British soldiers. Two schools were established during Lawrence's lifetime, at Sanawar and Mount Abu, a third followed a year after his death at Lovedale, whilst a fourth was later built in his memory at Ghora Gali.

== History ==
In his book The Magic Mountains, historian Dane Kennedy states;

The hill stations of colonial India functioned as sanctuaries for the British ruling race, forming enclaves of British culture in the mountains of the subcontinent. Anglican church spires, quaint Tudor-style cottages, and Victorian flower gardens lovingly evoked a distant homeland, giving hill stations a distinct British identity in the midst of a foreign environment.

Further excerpt from The Magic Mountains: Hill Stations and the British Raj

The Lawrence Military Asylum was the earliest and most influential institution established to redeem orphans and other poor white children by transferring them to the hills. Its founder was the famed imperial consul Henry Lawrence, whose Evangelical solicitude for barrack children's moral and social fate inspired him in 1845 to propose the establishment of a military-style boarding school in the Indian highlands for the sons and daughters of British soldiers. His aim, as he described it, was to create "an Asylum from the debilitating effects of the tropical climate, and the demoralizing influence of Barrack-life; wherein they may obtain the benefits of a bracing climate, a healthy moral atmosphere, and a plain, useful, and above all religious education, adapted to fit them for employment suited to their position in life." Although Anglo-Indian children could and did gain admittance, Lawrence insisted that preference be given to children of "pure European parentage" since they were "more likely to suffer from the climate of the plains." The first of these military asylums was opened at Sanawar near Simla in 1847, its construction financed by donations from fellow officers and a large grant from the maharaja of Kashmir. Subsequent branches appeared at Mount Abu in 1854, Ootacamund (later moved over a ridge to Lovedale) in 1858, and Murree in 1860, by which point the government had assumed responsibility for their finances. The Lawrence Asylums offered an education that stressed discipline, obedience, piety, respectability, and acquiescence to a future of limited opportunity. Boys wore artillery uniforms, girls drab jackets and white bonnets, and both were divided into military-style companies that marched on parade grounds. They did not depend on Indian servants; they did most tasks themselves so that they would become "trained in industrial habits." Lawrence envisioned his wards taking up manual trades like carpentry and smithing, creating the nucleus for a British artisanal class in India.

== Asylums ==
Four asylums were established around the Indian subcontinent, namely;

1. Sanawar (in present-day Himachal Pradesh) in 1847
2. Mount Abu (in present-day Rajasthan) in 1856
3. Lovedale near Ootacamund (in present-day Tamil Nadu) in 1858
4. Ghora Gali (in present-day Punjab, Pakistan) in 1860.

At present, three of the four continue to function as schools, whilst the Mount Abu school was converted to Central Police Training College for the training of IPS officers after independence and after shifting of CPTC to Hyderabad as National Police Academy, the school at Mount Abu was converted to Internal Security Academy under the control of CRPF.

== See also ==
- Henry Montgomery Lawrence
- Lawrence School, Sanawar
- Lawrence School, Lovedale
- Lawrence College Ghora Gali
