= Honoria Lawrence =

Irish writer

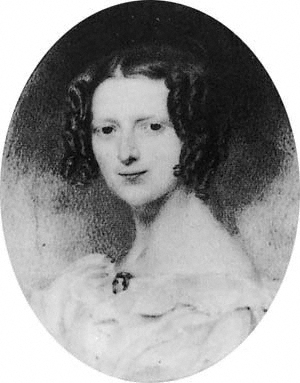
- Born: 25 December 1808; Carndonagh
- Died: 15 January 1854 (aged 45); Mount Abu
- Occupation: Writer
- Spouse(s): Henry Lawrence
- Children: 4

Honoria Marshall Lawrence, Lady Lawrence (25 December 1808 – 15 January 1854) was an Irish-born writer whose works, according to scholar Mary Ellis Gibson, "provide an intimate look at the domestic life of an Anglo-Indian woman during the first half of the nineteenth century". She was the first European woman known to live in several parts of the Indian subcontinent, including Kashmir and Nepal.

== Life ==
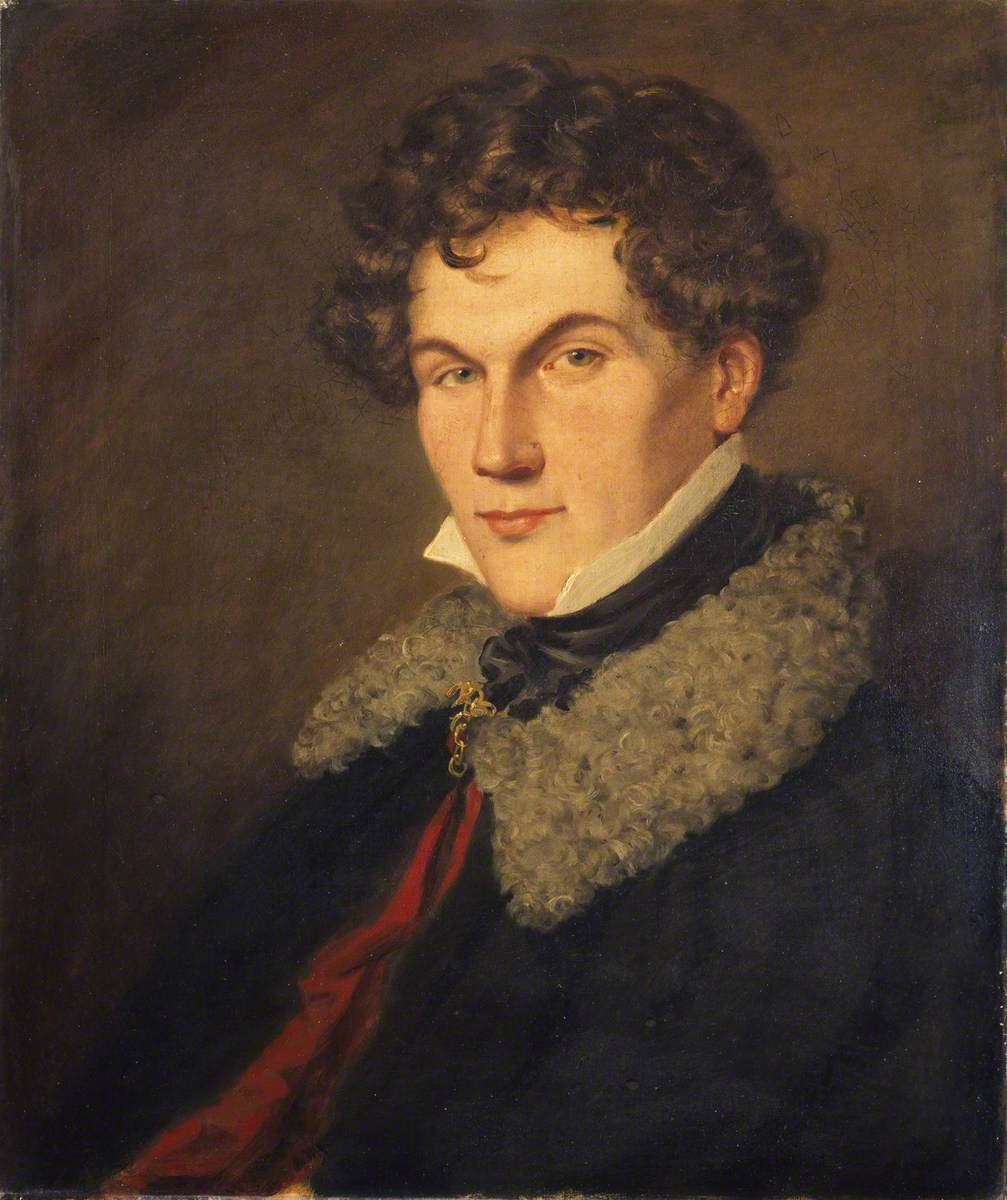
Henry Montgomery Lawrence, portrait by James Heath Millington

Honoria Marshal was born on 25 December 1808 in Carndonagh, County Donegal, Ireland, the twelfth of fifteen children of Rev. George Marshall and Elizabeth Marshall. She was raised nearby by her uncle, the husband of George Marshall's sister, Rear Admiral William Heath (1748–1815).

She first met her future husband Henry Montgomery Lawrence in 1827. He was her second cousin and at the time only a junior officer serving in India. The next spring they spent a whirlwind two weeks seeing the sights of London, a first visit for both of them. He was deterred from proposing marriage at the time due to his low income. They kept up a correspondence for nearly a decade until Henry Lawrence, now a captain, proposed by letter. In April 1837, she set sail for Calcutta.

She arrived in Calcutta in early July, but Captain Lawrence was still on his long journey from the interior of the country, where he was engaged in surveying the Gorakhpur and Allahabad districts. They were eventually reunited and married on 21 August. From then on, she was almost always at his side as a "lady in camp", supporting and assisting in his work.

Henry Lawrence's assistant, Saunders Abbott, recorded his impression of Honoria Lawrence accompanying her husband in surveying the jungle of the Himalayan foothills:

[...] tigers and wild elephants gave unmistakable signs of their presence. And, to my utter surprise, I found Mrs. Lawrence. . . . she was seated on the bank of a nullah, her feet overhanging the den of some wild animal, a portfolio on her lap, writing overland letters; her husband, at no great distance, laying his theodolite. In such roughings this admirable wife was delighted to share; and at other times she would lighten his labour by reading books he wished to consult, or making notes and extracts for his literary work.

When Henry Lawrence's duties allowed a more stable family life, Lawrence still assisted her husband with his work. In Ferozepore, where he was civil administrator, she helped run the post office.

In late 1843, now-Major Henry Lawrence was appointed Resident in Nepal. Initially, Henry Lawrence went to Katmandu, as women were not allowed, but he received special dispensation, and in 1844 Lawerence became the first European women to reside in the country. She was happy with the stability the new position entailed and enthralled with Nepal itself. She wrote "It was unlike anything I ever saw, more like an artificial model than any actual scenery, and suggested a crowd of new and strange ideas." They lived in Nepal for nearly two years.

Their next residency was the Punjab, where Henry Lawrence was appointed Resident in Lahore and wielded significant political power, and Honoria Lawrence was again at his side. One of her primary acts was to assist in the founding of The Lawrence School in 1847 as a school for the children of soldiers. They returned to the British Isles in 1848, where her husband was knighted and thus she became Lady Lawrence. When she returned she wrote "I always liked India and now I like it better than ever." While there she continued to keep a journal and among other things she wrote of James Abbott, the Deputy Commissioner of Hazara, "as a patriarch" living "among his people" describing how it seemed to be "many years since shears or razor approached him" describing the unconventional style of man who was governing the mountain tribes on the border areas of Punjab and Kashmir. Honoria Lawrence had been in Hazara because her husband was there investigating the murder of two British civilians.

In 1853, Sir Henry disagreed with some political decisions made regarding the region and resigned in protest. He became the Governor-General's Agent in Rajputana. Honoria Lawrence died in Rajputana, at Mount Abu, on 16 January 1854.

== Writing ==
Throughout her life, Honoria Lawrence was a voracious writer, including numerous journals and letters. In the 1830s she began an unfinished novel.

The Lawrences' collaboration included writing, as Honoria Lawrence handled much of her husband's correspondence and edited or co-authored his numerous articles on military and political topics for the Delhi Gazette and Calcutta Review. She also contributed her own articles on topics like marriage and motherhood to the Calcutta Review and the Friend of India. She co-wrote her husband's novel Some Passages in the Life of an Adventurer in the Punjaub, published in installments in the Delhi Gazette.

Her poetry was privately circulated and was on more personal topics, such as her marriage and the death of her brother, who was killed on the retreat from the Battle of Kabul in 1842.

One of her journals contains a short "dramatic sketch" satirizing two British officers whose conduct she found distasteful.

Her journals were published in 1980 by John Lawrence, a descendant of hers, and Audrey Woodiwiss as The Journals of Honoria Lawrence: India Observed, 1837–1854.

== Family ==
Honoria and Henry Lawrence were married for sixteen years. Honoria had two sons, two daughters, and one miscarriage. Her death may have been due to complications from a pregnancy so late in life.

Their children were:

- Honoria Letitia Lawrence (died 18 December 1923), who married Henry George Hart, schoolmaster of Sedbergh School.
- Sir Alexander Hutchinson Lawrence, 1st Baronet (1838 – 27 August 1864)
- Letitia Catherine Lawrence (10 November 1840 – 1 August 1841)
- Sir Henry Waldemar Lawrence, 3rd Baronet (24 January 1845 – 3 June 1908)
