= Lovedale, Nilgiris =

Village in Tamil Nadu, India

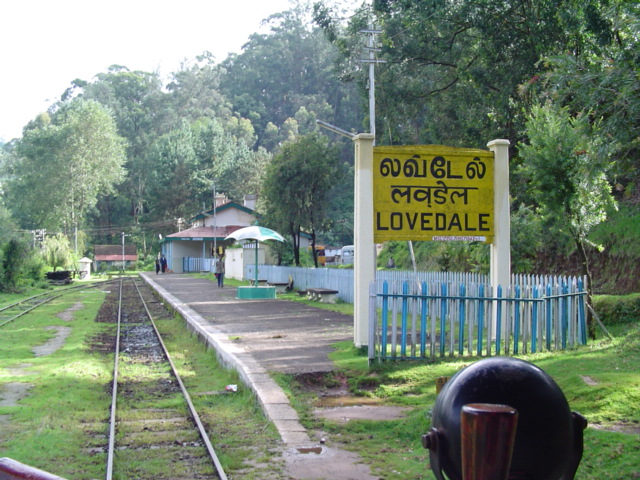
Lovedale railway station

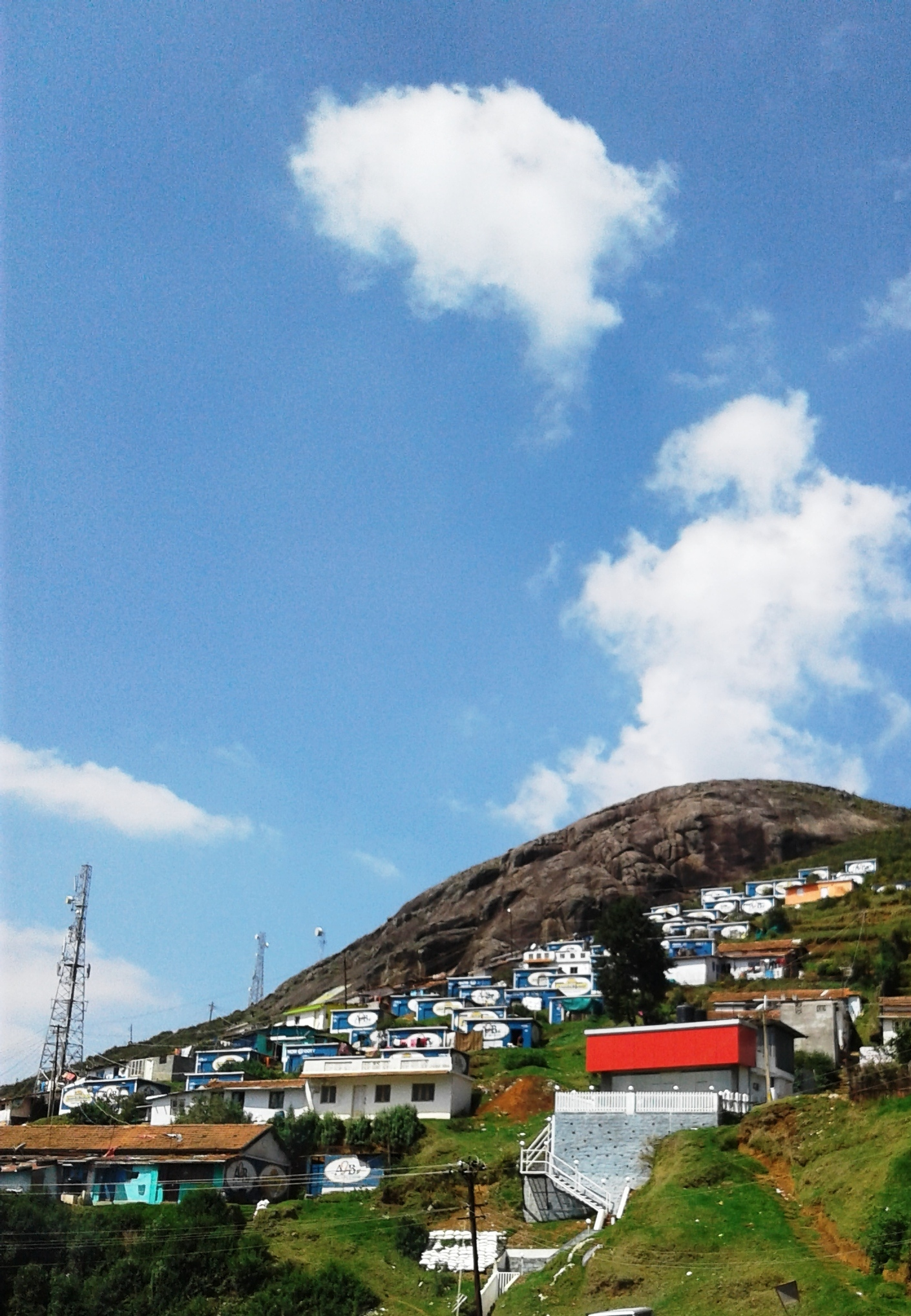
Lovedale Junction

Lovedale is a village situated in the Nilgiri Hills in the state of Tamil Nadu in India. It is one of the highest places above mean sea level in the Nilgiris. Today, it is notable for tourism.

== Nearest large population areas ==
- Ooty (5 km away). The Queen of Hills is located just 5 km away from Lovedale.
- Conoor (16 km)
- Wellington
- Nilambur

== Population ==
The permanent population is about 1,000-1,500 people. The residents of The Lawrence School add another 1,000 people to this.

== Establishments ==
The Lawrence School is a residential school. Lovedale has a police station that serves Lovedale and the nearby villages. It also has a small post office and a bank (branch of SBI), both of which primarily serve The Lawrence School.

== Educational institutions ==
- Lawrence School, Lovedale
- St. Antony's High School, Lovedale
- Nilgiris Matriulation higher Secondary school, Lovedale

== Climate ==
Lovedale features a subtropical highland climate (Cwb) under Köppen climate classification. It, along with Ooty, are located in the highest part of the Nilgiri Hills. Due to its location in the Nilgiris, Lovedale gets rain from both the monsoons. The wet season runs from April to December and the dry season from January to March. There is a difference of 345 mm of precipitation between the driest and wettest months. Throughout the year, temperatures vary by 4.2 °C.

Climate data for Lovedale
Month	Jan	Feb	Mar	Apr	May	Jun	Jul	Aug	Sep	Oct	Nov	Dec	Year
Mean daily maximum °C (°F)	19.0 (66.2)	19.9 (67.8)	21.8 (71.2)	22.1 (71.8)	21.8 (71.2)	18.3 (64.9)	17.0 (62.6)	17.8 (64.0)	18.9 (66.0)	18.9 (66.0)	18.7 (65.7)	18.8 (65.8)	19.4 (66.9)
Daily mean °C (°F)	12.4 (54.3)	13.5 (56.3)	15.3 (59.5)	16.3 (61.3)	16.6 (61.9)	14.8 (58.6)	14.1 (57.4)	14.4 (57.9)	14.5 (58.1)	14.6 (58.3)	13.7 (56.7)	13.0 (55.4)	14.4 (58.0)
Mean daily minimum °C (°F)	5.4 (41.7)	6.6 (43.9)	8.8 (47.8)	10.6 (51.1)	11.5 (52.7)	11.4 (52.5)	11.3 (52.3)	11.2 (52.2)	10.7 (51.3)	10.4 (50.7)	8.7 (47.7)	6.6 (43.9)	9.4 (49.0)
Average precipitation mm (inches)	23.5 (0.93)	21.2 (0.83)	38.3 (1.51)	109.4 (4.31)	160.5 (6.32)	206.1 (8.11)	366.2 (14.42)	253.6 (9.98)	204.2 (8.04)	263.3 (10.37)	177.3 (6.98)	77.7 (3.06)	1,901.3 (74.86)
Average rainy days	2	2	3	8	10	13	16	14	10	15	10	7	103
Source: Climate-Data.org

Minsara kanavu climax was shot in this area.

== Transport ==
- By rail: The NMR (UNESCO World Heritage Site) passes through Lovedale. Lovedale is the second to last railway station on the route to Ooty from Mettupalayam, and is also the highest station on the entire route.
- By road: Lovedale is situated just 5 km from Ooty and one can take a taxicab or bus from there. The bus is the cheapest way to get there, with tickets costing just Rs 5.

== See also ==
- Lovedale (South Africa)
