= Saaz Aggarwal =

Indian writer, oral historian and artist

- Born: 5 October 1961 (age 64)
- Occupation: biographer, oral historian, artist
- Website: saazaggarwal.com

Saaz Aggarwal (born 1961) is a Pune-based Indian-English writer, biographer, oral historian, independent researcher, and artist. Best known for her extensive efforts in documenting the culture, heritage, and Partition experiences of the Sindhi diaspora, her writing and art also prominently feature themes of satire and parody.

== Early life and education ==
Saaz was born in Bombay (now Mumbai) in 1961 and grew up in the Nilgiris, where her father worked as a tea planter. She attended boarding school from the age of five, spending her final six years at The Lawrence School, Lovedale. Saaz pursued a Bachelor of Science in mathematics at Jai Hind College, Mumbai, followed by an Master of Science in mathematics at Mumbai University in 1982.

== Language, loss and cultural exploration ==
Saaz's upbringing was shaped by her multicultural heritage, which was uncommon for the time. Her father belonged to the Chitrapur Saraswat Brahmin community, while her mother was Sindhi, both from families with multiple generations of formal education.

Despite her multicultural upbringing and the influence of many languages, English became her primary language of expression. This linguistic identity became a focal point during the Jaipur Literature Festival in January 2023, where she was initially invited to join a panel on Sindhi literature. After explaining her inability to contribute in Sindhi, the panel was restructured to focus on "Mother Tongue," allowing her to share her perspectives on language loss and identity.

== Early career and journalism ==
From December 1982 to March 1986, Saaz taught undergraduate Mathematics at Ruparel College, Mumbai, and took a career break when she had a baby in 1986. Her transition to writing professionally began after becoming a single parent in 1989. She began contributing articles to various Mumbai publications, and in December 1990, was appointed Features Editor at The Times of India, where she launched Ascent, a human resources supplement.

In 1993, after marrying Ajay Aggarwal, Saaz moved to Pune. For the next few years, she was Pune correspondent for Femina and contributed regular columns and articles to local and national publications, including Maharashtra Herald, Indian Express, Sunday Mid-Day, Verve, and Outlook. From 1998 to 2006, Saaz worked as Head of Human Resources and Quality at Seacom, an Information Technology company co-founded with her husband, eventually selling Seacom to Zensar in 2006. In 2006, Saaz began writing weekly book reviews for the Sunday Mid-Day, covering a variety of genres and interviewing authors including at the Jaipur Literature Festival.

== Memoirs and corporate biographies ==
Beginning in 2006, Saaz started helping individuals and corporations document their histories. Notable works include:

- Did I Really Do All This (2024) memoirs of Vijay Raman, published by Rupa Publications.
- Building Dreams (2022) memoirs of Vasudevan Ramamoorthy, founding Chairman of Vascon Engineers Ltd.
- The Weikfield Legacy Stories (2022).
- An Elephant Kissed My Window and other stories from the tea plantations of South India (2019) co-written with M. Ravindran.
- Even Against All Odds (2019) memoirs of Sunder Advani, a pioneer of India's luxury hotel segment.
- The Forbes Marshall Story (2016) – Corporate history of Forbes Marshall.
- Forgotten Tales from my Village, Harwai (2015) – memoirs of Hari Gobind Narayan Dubey.
- Odyssey (2014) – memoirs of Dr. N.P. Tolani.
- Bicycles, Boilers, and Beliefs (2011) – memoirs of Darius Forbes.
- The Spirit of Sandvik (2010) – Corporate history of Sandvik Asia.
- There’s No Such Thing as a Self-Made Man (2008) – memoirs of P.P. Chhabria, founder of Finolex.
- Doing it My Way (2006) – memoirs of S.P. Malhotra, founder of Weikfield.

== Art and exhibitions ==
In November 2005, Saaz held her first solo art exhibition, Bombay Clichés, at the Bajaj Art Gallery in Mumbai. The exhibition showcased satirical and quirky depictions of urban India in a Madhubani folk style.

From 26 January 2017, Saaz became a regular participant in Pune's annual Art Mandai, an initiative conceived and managed by artist and academic Gauri Gandhi. This event brought together artists and vegetable vendors in a traditional market setting.

== Publishing and Sindhi heritage ==
In 2010, Saaz founded Black-and-White Fountain, a publishing imprint, and released The Songbird on My Shoulder, a collection of her humour and parody writings.

In November 2012, she published Sindh: Stories from a Vanished Homeland, evolving from an oral history project inspired by conversations with her mother about life in Sindh before, during and after Partition. The book, later published by Oxford University Press (Pakistan) as Sindh: Stories from a Lost Homeland, received acclaim for its documentation of Sindhi history and culture and is recognized as a classic in Sindh studies.

Her contributions to documenting and preserving Sindhi heritage include:

=== Books authored ===
- Sindh: Stories from a Vanished Homeland (2012)
- Sindh: Stories from a Lost Homeland (2013) `– published by Oxford University Press (Pakistan)
- Tales from Yerwada Jail by Rita Shahani, translated by Saaz Aggarwal (2013) ISBN 978-81-922728-4-9
- The Amils of Sindh: a Narrative History of a Remarkable Community (2019) ISBN 978-93-83465-08-8
- Sindhi Tapestry: An Anthology of Reflections on the Sindhi Identity (2021) – featuring sixty short pieces by various contributors, including academics, poets, writers, and celebrities. The anthology explores facets of the evolving Sindhi identity through personal narratives and rare archival photographs.
- Losing Home, Finding Home, (2022) an illustrated collection of selected stories which trace the experience of Sindhi Partition refugees, highlighting their resilience and contributions and a glimpse into the global diaspora.

=== Books published ===
- Sunrise Over Valiwade by Susheel Gajwani (2024) ISBN 978-93-83465-43-9
- Refugees in their own country by Sunayna Pal (2022)
- While Sowing Dreams by Mohan Gehani (2021) ISBN 978-93-83465-25-5
- My Sindh by Shakuntala Bharvani (2021) ISBN 978-93-83465-24-8
- Beyond the Rainbow by Murli Melwani (2020) ISBN 978-93-83465-16-3

=== Literary and academic articles and presentations on Sindh ===
- Hemu Kalani: A lost freedom hero from Sindh and a homeland cleaved apart published in Scroll.in, 15 August 2024
- A mother tongue Partition consumed intact published in Scroll.in, 29 January 2023
- Urban Legacies – tracing the Sindhi and Parsi heritage of Mumbai, Avid Learning, 17 January 2023
- Kindness in the time of Partition in The Usawa Literary Review, 29 October 2022
- For Sindhis, Partition Meant Loss of a Homeland, of a Culture and a Language in The Wire, 19 August 2022
- The pain of Partition as seen in the literature of many languages in The Wire, 14 August 2022
- How refugees from Sindh rebuilt their lives – and India – after Partition in Scroll.in, 13 August 2022
- Podcast with Sonam Kalra for The 1947 Partition Archive on 18 July 2022
- Sindhiness and the untold truth about Partition on the Global Indian Series podcast with Rajan Singh Nazrana on 30 March 2022
- Sahitya Akademi seminar on Sindhi writers who have contributed in languages other than Sindhi, paper on Dr Murli Melwani: A Writer of Significant Influence, 4 February 2022
- Memories and history: how Partition affected the lives of ordinary people, public lecture at Oral History Association of India (OHAI) workshop on 11 October 2020
- Rootless - but bound by ties that encircle the globe, talk at IIT Kharagpur Partition Lecture Series 2020 on 21 September 2020
- Freedom fighters: The inspiring story of a Sindhi woman, Kala Shahani, and her husband Shanti in Scroll.in, 15 August 2019
- After Partition, Sindhis Turned Displacement Into Determination and Enterprise article on Partition for The Wire on 11 August 2017
- Wherever: a paper presented at the Conference Sindh Through The Centuries by Sindh Madressatul Islam University in Karachi 25 March 2014

=== Tapestry podcast ===
- Sindhi food – beyond papad! With Sapna Ajwani | Episode 8
- Their dedication to education | Episode 7
- Partition with Nandita Bhavnani | Episode 6
- Fighting for Freedom with Subash Bijlani | Episode 5
- Sindhi multinationals in colonial times with Claude Markovits | Episode 4
- Land of multi-faith harmony with Zulfiqar Ali Kalhoro | Episode 3
- I left my heart in … | Episode 2
- Stories from a Vanished Homeland | Episode 1
