= Nitin Khanna =

- Born: 18 March 1971 (age 55); Chandigarh, India
- Education: The Lawrence School, Sanawar; Purdue University
- Occupations: Founder & CEO of MergerTech

Nitin Khanna (born 18 March 1971) is an Indian-born entrepreneur settled in Portland, Oregon, United States. He is the chairman of MergerTech, an international mergers and acquisitions advisory firm. He is also the co-founder of Saber Corp., which is now acquired by EDS.

== Early life and education ==
Khanna completed his early education at the Lawrence School, Sanawar, and obtained his bachelor's and master's in Industrial Engineering from Purdue University.

== Career ==
Khanna has been the CEO of MergerTech since its inception in 2009. He co-founded a tech organization named Saber Corp in 1998, which was a provider of state government solutions in US. He helped it grow to 1200 employees and over $120MM in revenue by 2007, when he sold it to EDS for $460MM. Khanna then took over the leadership of EDS' government business operation.

Khanna has also worked with Oracle Corporation. In 2015, he started Cura Cannabis Solutions. He has invested $5 million in iSOS Inc., a productivity enhancement solutions software company. Khanna is a board member of Vendscreen, Freewire Broadband, TiE Oregon (non-profit) and the Classic Wines Auction (non-profit).

== Acquisitions ==
As the CEO of MergerTech, Khanna has led numerous mergers and acquisitions deals, including the following:

- Acquisition of ArcTouch by Grey
- Acquisition of Serene Corporation by AST Corporation
- Acquisition of GlobeSherpa by RideScout
- Strategic partnership of Media Labs with MDC Partners
- Acquisition of Springbrook by Accela
- Acquisition of AppThwack by Amazon Web Services
- Acquisition of Serus by E2open
- Acquisition of Mutual Mobile by WPP
- Acquisition of Simple by BBVA
- Acquisition of HPM Works by Cancom

== Awards ==
- Portland's Top 40 under 40 civic and entrepreneurial leaders in 2002

== Allegations ==
After being accused of sexually assaulting Lori Fale, a stylist he hired for his wedding at the Allison Inn, the day before the event, Khanna stepped down as CEO of Select cannabis oils, following news that he had reached a civil settlement with his accuser in the low 7 figures.
