= Charles Grenville Mansel =

English administrator in India

Charles Grenville Mansel (1806–1886) was an English administrator in India.

== Biography ==
Mansel was appointed a writer in the British East India Company's service on 30 April 1826. He was made assistant to the secretary of the western board of revenue in Bengal on 19 January 1827; registrar and assistant to the magistrate of Agra and officiating collector to the government of customs at Agra on 10 July 1828; acting magistrate of Agra, 1830; joint magistrate and deputy collector of Agra, 15 November 1831; acting magistrate and collector of Agra, 13 March 1832; secretary and superintendent of Agra College in 1834; magistrate and collector of Agra, 2 November 1835; and temporary secretary to the lieutenant-governor in political, general, judicial, and revenue departments, 21 February 1837.

From December 1838 to April 1841 he acted as Sudder settlement officer in Agra, and in 1842 published a valuable ‘Report on the Settlement of the District of Agra.’ In 1841 he became deputy accountant-general in Calcutta, and in 1843 one of the civil auditors. From 1844 to 1849 he was on furlough, and on his return to India was appointed a member of the board of administration for the affairs of the Punjáb, under the presidency of Sir Henry Montgomery Lawrence. In November 1850 he was gazetted the resident at Nagpur, where he remained till 1855, when he retired upon the East India Company's annuity fund. He is chiefly remembered as the junior member of the board to which was entrusted the administration and reorganisation of the Punjáb after its annexation.

He died at 7 Mills Terrace, West Brighton, England, on 19 November 1886.
