= Lawrence baronets of Lucknow (1858) =

Escutcheon of the Lawrence baronets of Lucknow

The Lawrence baronetcy, of Lucknow, was created in the Baronetage of the United Kingdom on 10 August 1858 for Alexander Hutchinson Lawrence. The title was in honour of the services of his father Sir Henry Montgomery Lawrence, who died during the Siege of Lucknow in 1857. There was a special remainder, failing male issue of his own, to his younger brother Henry Waldemar Lawrence, and his heirs.

== Lawrence baronets, of Lucknow (1858) ==
- Sir Alexander Hutchinson Lawrence, 1st Baronet (1838–1864)
- Sir Henry Hayes Lawrence, 2nd Baronet (1864–1898)
- Sir Henry Waldemar Lawrence, 3rd Baronet (1845–1908)
- Sir Alexander Waldemar Lawrence, 4th Baronet (1874–1939)
- Sir Henry Eustace Waldemar Lawrence, 5th Baronet (1905–1967)
- Sir John Waldemar Lawrence, 6th Baronet (1907–1999)
- Sir Henry Peter Lawrence, 7th Baronet (born 1952)

The heir apparent is the present holder's son Christopher Cosmo Lawrence (born 1979).
