= Lawrence School, Lovedale =

Public school in Tamil Nadu, India

The Lawrence School, Lovedale

Location
- Lovedale, Tamil Nadu, 643003; India; 11.379191°N 76.699258°E

Information
- Former names: Lawrence Memorial Royal Military School (LMRMS)
- School type: Coeducational Public School
- Motto: Never Give In
- Established: 6 September 1858; 168 years ago
- Founder: Sir Henry Lawrence
- School board: CBSE
- Chairman: Sanjay Kumar, IAS
- Headmaster: Dhavala Venkata Someswara Rao
- Enrollment: 700
- Language: English
- Affiliation: Round Square
- Alumni: Old Lawrencians
- Website: https://www.thelawrenceschool.org

The Lawrence School, Lovedale, is a fee-charging co-educational public boarding school located at Lovedale, a hill station on the Nilgiri Mountains in the southern Indian state of Tamil Nadu.

== History ==
Formerly known as Lawrence Memorial Royal Military School, the namesake of its founder, Brigadier-General Sir Henry Montgomery Lawrence KCB), who had mooted the idea of establishing a chain of British Raj military-style boarding schools at the hill stations of India to educate the children of the deceased and serving members of the British Indian Army. Although Lawrence was killed at The Residency, Lucknow, during the Indian Rebellion of 1857, his dream materialised and four such schools, known then as the Lawrence Military Asylums, were established: at Sanawar in 1847 and Mount Abu in 1856, both during his lifetime, and later at Lovedale in 1858 and at Ghora Gali in 1860.

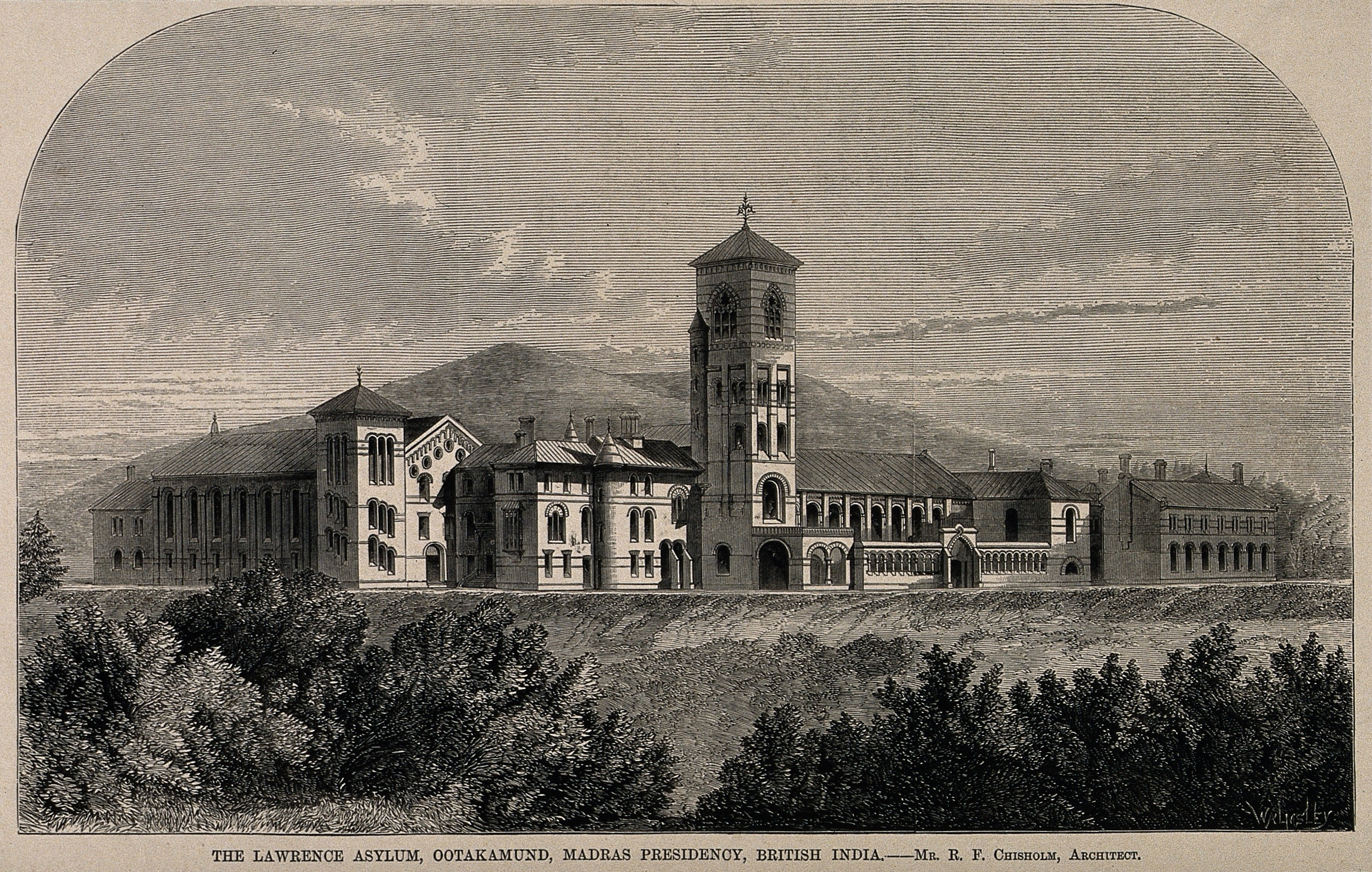
The Lawrence Asylum, Ootakamund, Madras Presidency, in 1873

== Campus ==
The Lawrence School, Lovedale has its campus on 700 acres leased from the Ministry of Defence in Lovedale, which is 6 kilometers (3.7 miles) from Ootacamund. Located at a height of 7,200 feet above mean sea level, it is slightly lower than the Dodabetta peak (altitude: 8650 feet), which is the highest peak of the Nilgiri mountain range.

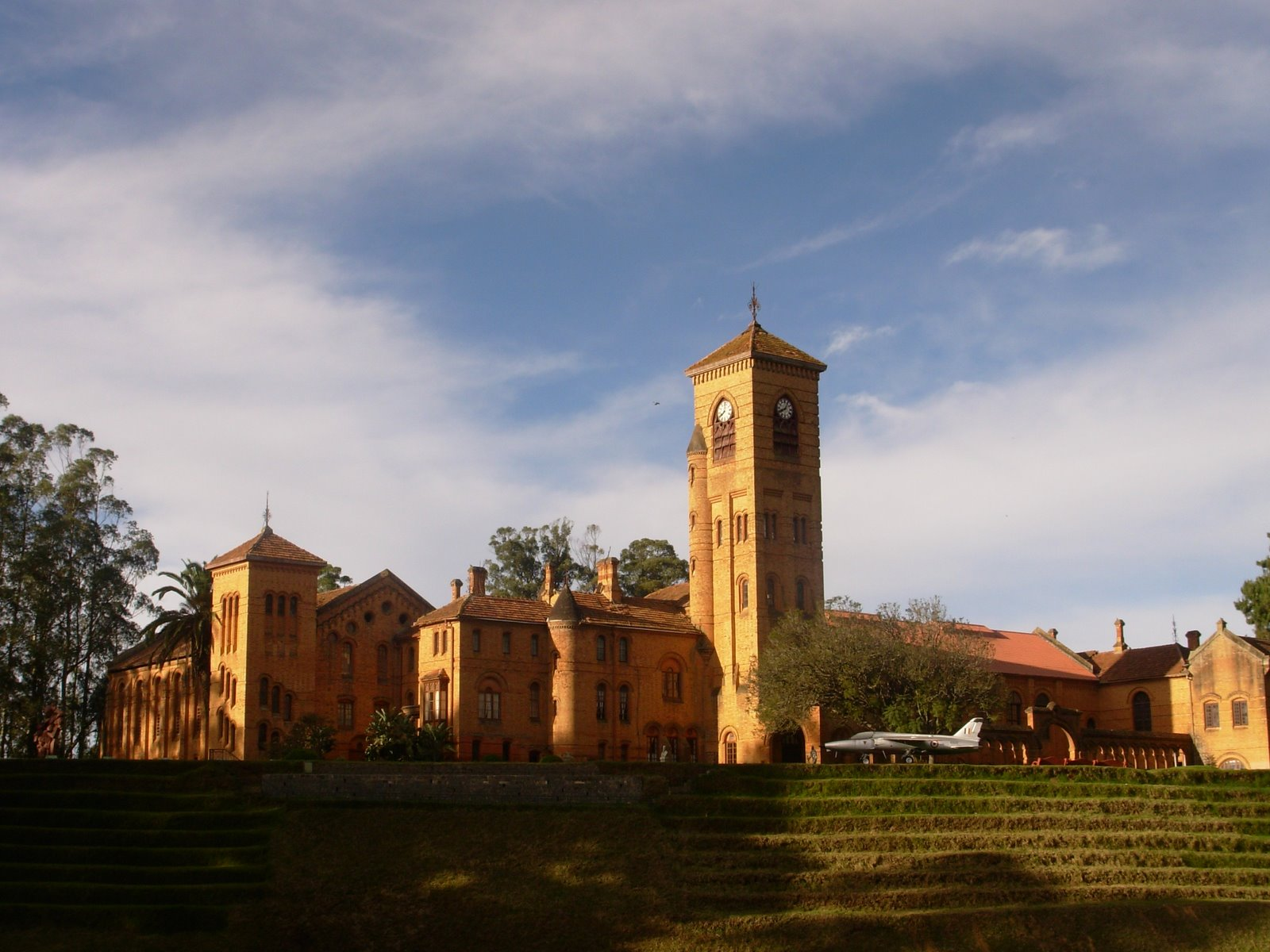
Main Building, The Lawrence School, Lovedale

Many notable personalities, including Prime Ministers Jawaharlal Nehru and Indira Gandhi, Presidents Zail Singh, Pranab Mukherjee and A. P. J. Abdul Kalam, and others such as Field Marshal Sam Manekshaw and Vice President Venkaiah Naidu, have visited this campus to grace the school's Founder's Day and other special occasions.

Several movies, TV shows, and commercial advertisements have been filmed in the school campus. Some of the popular ones include:

- The Archies (film)
- Adhura
- School of Lies
- Karwaan
- Raaz (2002 film)
- Notebook (2006 film)

== Architecture ==
On 31 May 1988, a commemorative postage stamp was issued by India Post to mark 130 years of the school's existence with an image displaying the towering campanile section of Italian Gothic styled architecture of the main building, which houses the Senior School and administrative offices.

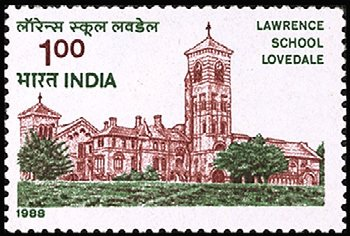
Postage featuring the Senior School main building.

== Students ==
The student body is from all over India and overseas, and is led by prefects headed by a head girl and head boy. The school also has a 40 percent reservation of seats and a 20 percent fee subsidy for children of Indian Defence personnel.

== Activities ==
The school is notable for requiring for all its students to learn horseback riding.

== Notable alumni ==
- Akshaye Khanna, film actor.
- Amish Tripathi, novelist, banker and diplomat.
- Anand Mahindra, businessperson, and chairman and managing director of the Mahindra Group.
- Vice Admiral Anil Chopra PVSM AVSM, naval officer and former Flag Officer Commanding-in-Chief of Eastern Naval Command.
- Anjolie Ela Menon, painter and Padma Shri awardee.
- Arun M. Kumar, venture capitalist, and former Chairman & CEO of KPMG India.
- Aryama Sundaram, lawyer, judge and former Supreme Court Justice of India and Singapore.
- Arundhati Roy, writer and social activist.
- C Vijayakumar, business executive, and President & CEO of HCL Technologies.
- General Dhiraj Seth AVSM, an army officer and Chief of Army Staff.
- Fahadh Faasil, film actor and producer.
- Gul Panag, politician, actor, model and 1999 Femina Miss India Universe.
- K. V. L. Narayan Rao, media executive and former CEO of NDTV.
- Kanika Tekriwal, entrepreneur and airline executive.
- M. M. Murugappan, businessperson, and former Executive Chairman of the Murugappa Group.
- Major Mohommed Ali Shah, an army officer and film actor.
- Nalini Ambady, social psychologist.
- Nikhil Dey, social activist.
- Nomita Chandy, social worker and Padma Shri awardee.
- Nosthush Kenjige, sportsperson and member of the United States national cricket team.
- Nungshi Malik, mountaineer and Nari Shakti Puraskar awardee.
- Palanivel Thiagarajan, banker, politician and member of the Tamil Nadu Council of Ministers.
- Paul Sabapathy CVO CBE, an accountant, business manager and former Lord Lieutenant of the West Midlands.
- Rear Admiral Philipose George Pynumootil AVSM NM, naval officer and former Flag Officer Naval Aviation.
- Pratap Pothen, film actor and producer.
- Ram Charan, film actor, producer and entrepreneur in Telugu cinema.
- Rear Admiral K. Raja Menon, a naval officer, military author and former Assistant Chief of Naval Staff (India).
- Saaz Aggarwal, writer, oral historian and artist.
- Sashi Reddi, entrepreneur and venture capitalist.
- Sanaya Irani, film actor.
- Tashi Malik, mountaineer and Nari Shakti Puraskar awardee.
- Vijay Menon, actor, editor, director and dubbing artist in Malayalam cinema.
