= The Lawrence School, Sanawar =

Co-Ed boarding school in Asia

- School logo

Location
- Kasauli, Solan, Himachal Pradesh; India; 30.902°N 76.994°E

Information
- Former names: The Lawrence Royal Military School
- Type: Private boarding school
- Motto: Never Give In
- Established: 15 April 1847; 179 years ago
- Founder: Henry Montgomery Lawrence
- School district: Solan
- Staff: 70
- Grades: Lower III (Class 5) - Upper VI (Class 12)
- Campus size: 139 Acres
- Colors: Red and white
- School fees: Approx. 9–11 lakh per annum
- Affiliation: Central Board of Secondary Education
- Alumni: Old Sanawarians (OSs)
- Houses: 1. Himalaya; 2. Nilagiri; 3. Siwalik; 4. Vindhya
- Headmaster: Ms. Ruchi Pradhan Datta
- Website: www.sanawar.edu.in

The Lawrence School, Sanawar is a private boarding school in Himachal Pradesh, India. Located near Kasauli in Shimla Hills, it was established in 1847. Its history, influence, and wealth have made it one of the most prestigious and oldest schools in the world. It is the oldest co-educational boarding school in Asia.

Situated in Solan district, Sanawar is about an hour's drive from Chandigarh. The school, founded by Sir Henry Lawrence and his wife Honoria, is one of the oldest surviving boarding schools.

The school is often referred to as "Sanawar". It is situated at a height of 1,750 metres and spread over an area of 139 acres, heavily forested with pine, deodar and other conifer trees. The school has been ranked among the best residential schools of India. In May 2013 Sanawar created history by becoming the first school in the world to send a team of seven students to climb Mount Everest. The motto of the school is "Never Give In".

Sanawar is affiliated to India's Central Board of Secondary Education. Children are admitted to Sanawar in February each year, at the age of nine and ten years. Class Five (Lower III) is preferred as the entry point. Admission is based on a competitive entrance examination, held the preceding November, followed by a personal interview.

== History ==
In the school's name, "Sanawar" is the name of the hill on which it stands. The nearest railway station is now usually spelt "Sonwara". Sanawar is believed to be the oldest mixed-gender boarding school anywhere in the world.

Henry Lawrence's intent was to provide for the education of the orphans of British soldiers and other poor white children. In 1845 he outlined the creation of a boarding school in the Indian highlands for boys and girls.

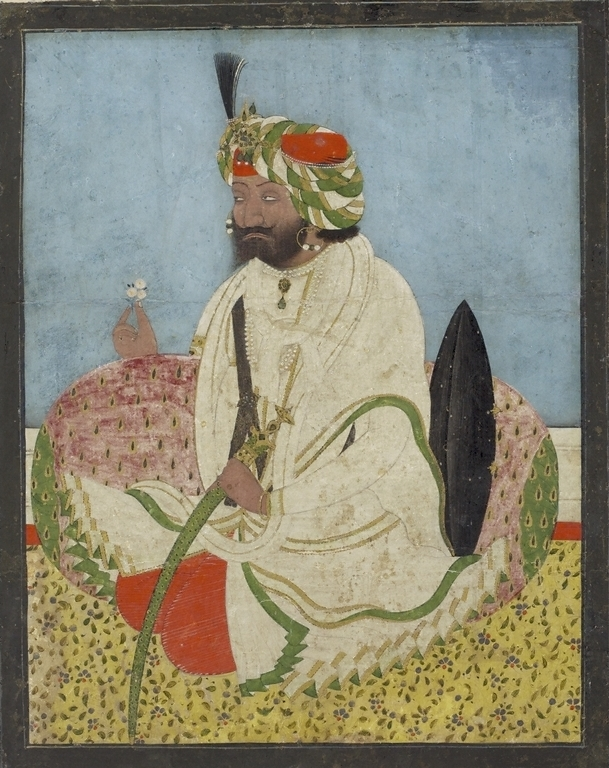
Maharaja Gulab Singh, a large contributor to the founding of the school

The school at Sanawar was established as the first such asylum on 15 April 1847, when fourteen girls and boys arrived at Sanawar in the charge of Lawrence's sister-in-law Charlotte Lawrence, wife of George Lawrence, and a superintendent Healey. The school was co-educational from its beginning. The site had been chosen by Lawrence, after discussions with William Hodson and others, considering that it was an "ideal location" which "afforded the necessary requisites: isolation, ample space, water, a good altitude, and all not too far from British troops". The construction of the buildings was paid for by Lawrence and other British officers, with a large contribution from Gulab Singh, the first Maharaja of the princely state of Jammu and Kashmir. Hodson, who later became famous for Hodson's Horse, supervised the construction of the school's first buildings and is still commemorated by the annual Hodson's Run, a competition between the school's houses. In the early days some Anglo-Indian children were admitted, but Lawrence insisted that preference should be given to those of "pure European" parentage, as he considered they were more likely to suffer from the heat of the plains.

Under its first professional headmaster, W. J. Parker, who was appointed in 1848, the school was known as "Lawrence's Asylum", reflecting its focus on orphans. In 1858 it was renamed the "Lawrence Royal Military School".

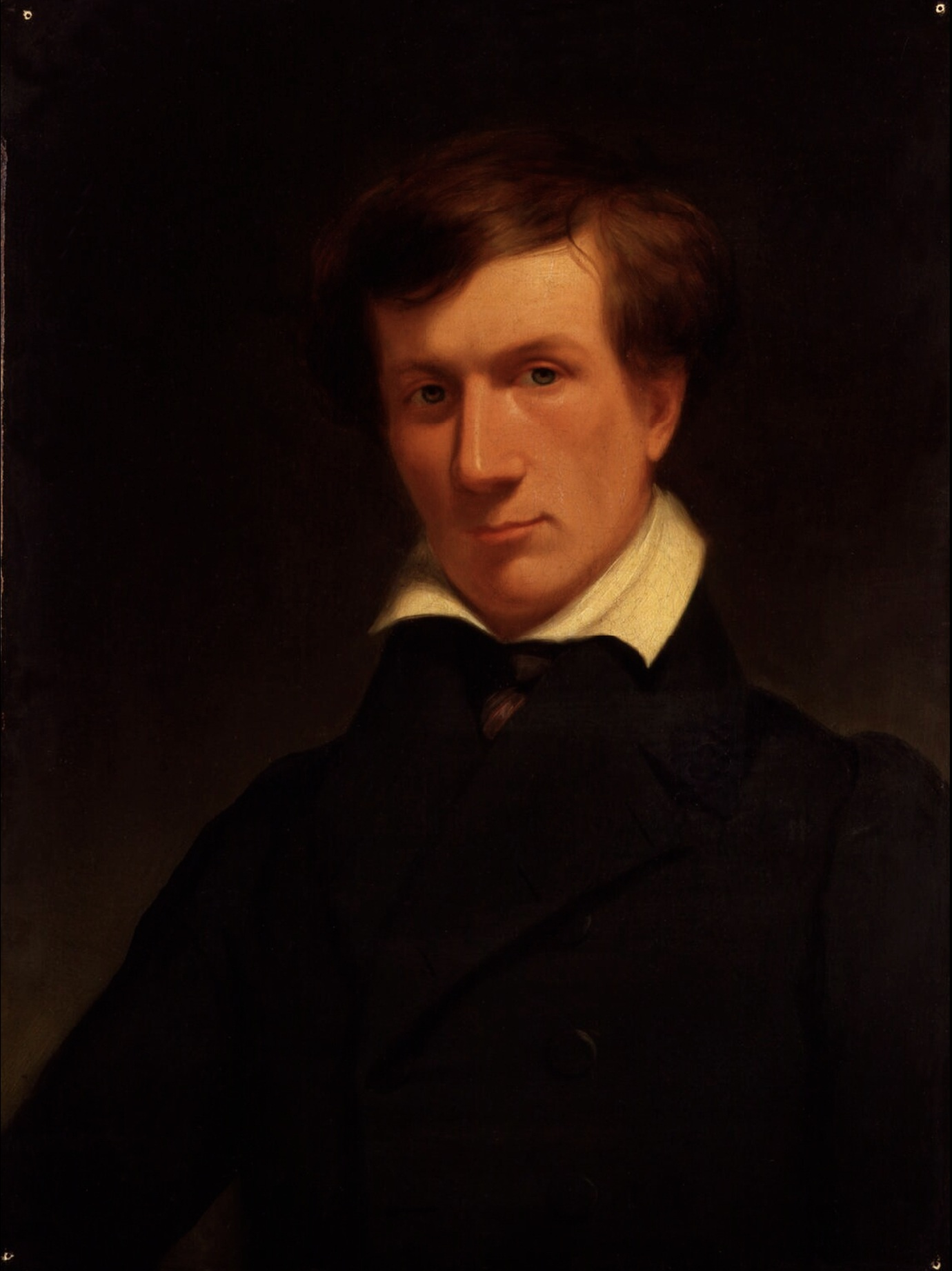
Sir Henry Lawrence, founder

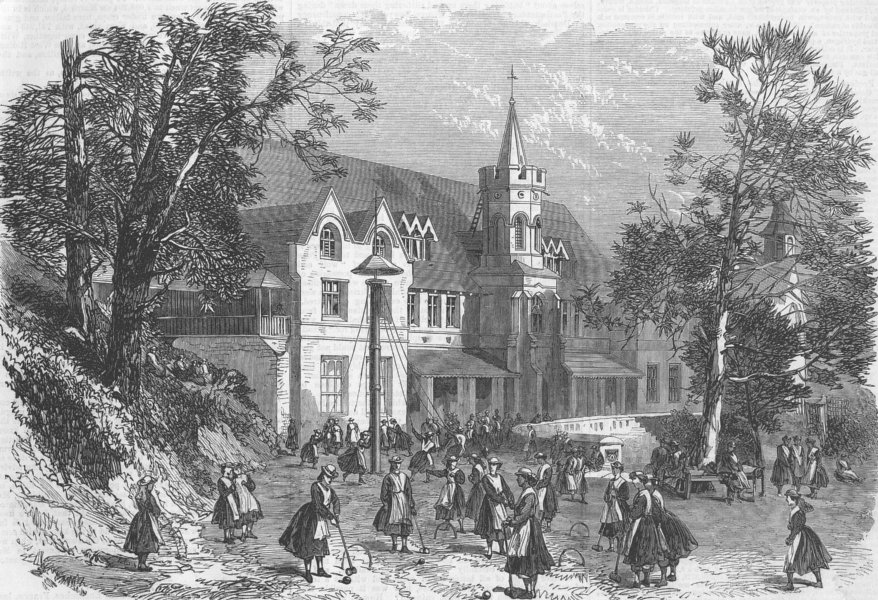
The Girls' Building of the Lawrence Military Asylum, in 1867

In its first two decades, the school suffered an unexpectedly high death rate, with forty children dying between 1848 and 1858, of whom thirteen were the victims of an outbreak of cholera in 1857. In the next ten years, there were seventy-two further deaths, and in 1870 a Punjab Medical Department report proposed measures to improve the school's sanitation, as well as "a separate hospital for the treatment of contagious diseases". The headmaster, John Cole, was inspired to write a book called Notes on Hygiene with Hints on Self-discipline for Young Soldiers in India (1882).

However, the then-Governor General, Lord Mountbatten, presided at the centenary celebrations and read out a message from King George VI. In June 1952 the ministry resolved to administer the school through a society created under the Societies Registration Act 1860, subject to a Memorandum of Association and rules and regulations to be approved by the government. These provided that the government Secretaries in the Ministries of Education, Defence, and Finance would serve as ex-officio members of the society, with four other members appointed by the government. The employees of the school, previously government servants, lost that status. The property and other assets of the school, which then had an estimated value of twenty-five lakhs of rupees, were transferred to the society with effect from June 1954.

The school celebrated its 150th anniversary in 1997, and India marked the occasion with a two-rupee commemorative postage stamp issued in October 1997 and inscribed "1847-1997 THE LAWRENCE SCHOOL SANAWAR".

== Present day ==
In 2003, The Tribune described it as one of about half a dozen elite public schools in India, catering to "an upwardly mobile landed and commercial elite". It is an international member of the Headmasters' and Headmistresses' Conference, based in England.

Together with some other leading Indian schools, including The Doon School, The Scindia School, The Daly College, Mayo College, Rajkumar College, and Baldwin Boys High School, Sanawar is a member of the Round Square Conference, a worldwide association of some eighty schools which exchange students with each other. Other member schools include Aiglon College in Switzerland, Ballarat Grammar School in Australia, Deerfield Academy and Chadwick School in the United States, Wellington in England, and Gordonstoun in Scotland.

The school honours its original purpose by continuing to offer a reduction in fees for the children of military families. About a quarter of the boarders are the sons and daughters of former pupils. Till recently, as part of its annual Founder's Day celebrations, attended by many Old Sanawarians, the school continued to troop the Royal colours. Until 1990, a significant number of school-leavers continued to join the armed forces but there has been a sharp decline in this tradition, and in 2011 one Old Sanawarian brigadier was quoted in The Times of India as saying that in his day "the main aim was to join the forces, but now hardly anyone is interested in doing so".

Sanawar is divided into four houses—Himalaya, Nilagiri, Siwalik and Vindhya. The houses compete with each other at activities such as cricket, cross country running, debating and many other activities.

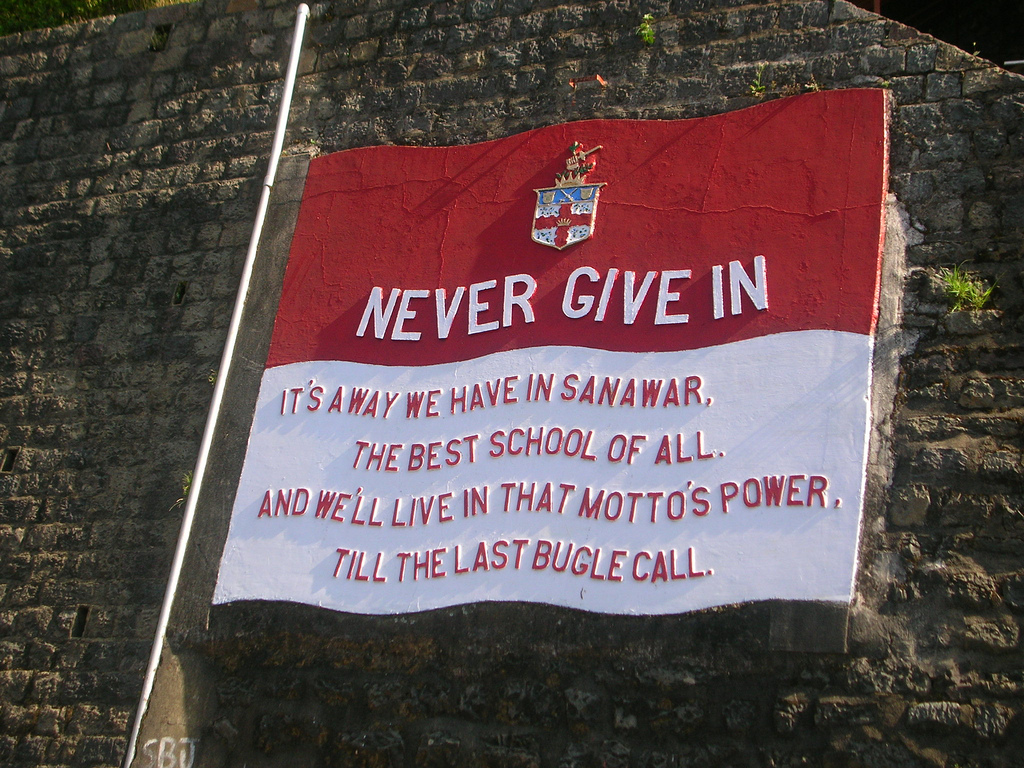
The school motto, "Never give in"

== Notable alumni ==
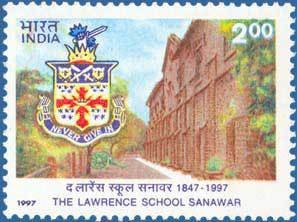
Stamp of India 1997 Lawrence School Sanawar

Sanawar's former pupils are known as "Old Sanawarians", "OS" for short

=== Public life ===
- Amarinder Singh (born 1942), Former Chief Minister of Punjab
- Sukhbir Singh Badal (born 1962), Former Deputy Chief Minister of Punjab president, Shiromani Akali Dal
- Omar Abdullah (born 1970), Chief Minister of Jammu and Kashmir
- Naveen Patnaik, Former Chief Minister of Odisha
- Dushyant Chautala, former Deputy Chief Minister of Haryana
- Gurinder Singh Dhillon, Sant Satguru of Radha Soami Satsang Beas
- Chander Mohan, former Deputy Chief Minister of Haryana
- Navin Chawla (born 1945), former Chief Election Commissioner of India
- Maneka Gandhi (born 1956), Union Minister Child and women welfare, environmentalist and animal welfare activist.
- Jetsun Pema, Queen consort of Bhutan
- Rao Inderjit Singh (born 1951), politician, Union Minister of State for Defence Production
- Bikram Singh Majithia, Former Minister in Government of Punjab
- Ajatshatru Singh, former Cabinet Minister in the Jammu and Kashmir Government
- Taranjit Singh Sandhu, Lt Governor of Delhi
- Uzair, former minister in government of Jammu and Kashmir.
- Vinod Sultanpuri, MLA, Himachal Pradesh

=== Armed services ===
- Vishnu Bhagwat, a former Chief of Naval Staff, India
- Arun Khetarpal (1950-1971), youngest officer recipient of the Param Vir Chakra
- K. C. Cariappa

=== Business ===
- Sonny Mehta, publisher and editor-in-chief of Alfred A. Knopf
- Jehangir Wadia, managing director of GoAir and Bombay Dyeing
- Ness Wadia (born 1970), managing director of the Bombay Burmah Trading Corporation
- Rakesh Mohan, Mohan Meakin Limited
- Nitin Khanna, entrepreneur, founder and CEO of MergerTech.
- Satjiv S. Chahil, Silicon Valley multimedia marketer
- Punit Renjen, Deloitte chairman
- Pankaj M Munjal, Hero Cycles chairman and managing director
- Kiran Nadar, Philanthropist and founder, Kiran Nadar Museum of Arts

=== Sports ===
- Manavjit Singh Sandhu, Indian Olympic team, 2012, world trap shooting champion, 2010, and Commonwealth Games gold medallist
- Ajeet Bajaj (born 1965), first Indian to ski to the North Pole and the South Pole within a year.
- Ranjit Bhatia, athlete who ran in the marathon and 5000 meters events at the 1960 Summer Olympics
- Shiva Keshavan, Asian Champion, represented India in luge in 6 Winter Olympic Games in 1998, 2002, 2006, 2010, 2014 and 2018.
- Saif Ali Khan, actor
- Kirat Bhattal, actor
- Papa CJ, stand-up comedian
- Shaad Ali, film director
- Pooja Bedi, actress and talk show host
- Feroze Gujral, model
- Siddharth Kak, film maker, television producer, and presenter
- Iqbal Khan, actor
- Apoorva Lakhia, film maker
- Tarun Mansukhani, director and writer
- Rahul Roy, actor
- Parikshit Sahni, film and television actor
- Amar Talwar, actor
- Bikramjeet Kanwarpal, film and television actor
- Vir Das, actor and stand-up comedian
- Varun Sharma, actor
- Sheena Chohan, actress and Celebrity Scientologist

=== Other ===
- Parveen Kumar, president of the British Medical Association
- Iloosh Ahluwalia, artist

== Headmasters ==
- 1848—1863: W. J. Parker
- 1864—1884: J. Cole
- 1884—1912: A. H. Hildersley
- 1912—1932: Rev. G. D. Barne, later Bishop of Lahore
- 1932—1933: E.S. Hunt
- 1933—1941: A.E. Evans
- 1941—1946: C.G O'Hagan
- 1946—1947: H.E. Hazel
- 1947—1956: E. G. Carter
- 1956—1970: Ravi Somdutt
- 1970—1970: Trevor C Kemp (acting)
- 1970—1973: B. R. Pasricha
- 1973—1974: Bhupendra Singh (acting)
- 1974—1988: Shomie Ranjan Das
- 1988—1995: Sumer B. Singh
- 1995—1999: Harish Dhillon OS
- 1999—2000: Rene A. Solomon (acting)
- 2000—2003: Andrew Gray
- 2003—2003 (May to September): Derek Mountford (acting)
- 2003—2004: Gautam Chatterjee
- 2005—2014: Praveen Vasisht
- 2014—2016: Shonu Mukherjee (Offg.)
- 2016—2019: Vinay Pande
- 2020–2026: Himmat Singh Dhillion
- 2026- Present: Ruchi Pradhan Datta

== In fiction ==
In Rudyard Kipling's novel Kim (1901), a priest called Father Victor proposes that the central character, the boy Kim, should be sent to Sanawar, of which he says "It's miraculous beyond all whooping" and adds "We'll make a man of you at Sanawar - even at the price o' making you a Protestant".

Parts of the movie Dhurandhar were filmed at this school. Jaskirat Singh Rangi's training location, shown in the song Destiny, and classrooms are from this school

== See also ==
- Lawrence School, Lovedale
