= Lumsden (surname) =

Lumsden is a surname of Scottish origin. Notable people with the surname include:

- Alexander Lumsden (1843–1904), Canadian politician
- Alfred Forbes Lumsden (1877–1918), British Army officer
- Andrew Lumsden (bishop) (1654–1733), Bishop of Edinburgh 1727-1733
- Andrew Lumsden (choral director) (born 1962), son of David Lumsden
- Andrew Lumsden (scientist) (born 1947), British neurobiologist
- Andrew J. Lumsden, see Te Radar
- Anthony J. Lumsden (1928–2011), American architect
- Charles J. Lumsden (born 1949), Canadian biologist
- David Lumsden (musician) (1928-2023), father of Andrew Lumsden
- David Lumsden (poet) (born 1964), Australian poet, see Nocturnal Submissions
- David Lumsden (actor), British actor, see Wild Geese II
- David Lumsden, Baron of Cushnie (1933–2008), Scottish heritage advocate and businessman
- Douglas Lumsden (born 1971), Scottish politician
- Dugald McTavish Lumsden (1851–1915), Scottish soldier
- Eddie Lumsden (rugby league) (1936–2019), Australian rugby league footballer
- Eddie Lumsden (born 1952), American politician
- Ernest Lumsden (1883–1948), British etcher and authority on etching
- Ernie Lumsden (1890–1982), Australian Rules footballer
- Frank Lumsden (1913–1965), English football player
- Brigadier General Frederick Lumsden (1872–1918), World War I British soldier (awarded the VC)
- Geoffrey Lumsden (1914–1984), British character actor
- George Lumsden (1815–1904), 19th century New Zealand politician
- Glenn Lumsden (born 1964), Australian comic book artist and writer
- Lieutenant-General Harry Lumsden (1821–1896), 19th century British general in India
- Lieutenant General Herbert Lumsden (1897–1945), World War II British general
- Ian Lumsden (born 1923), Scottish rugby union player
- Jack Lumsden (1927–2012), British Olympic pentathlete
- James Lumsden (disambiguation)
- Jan Lumsden (born 1945), Australian woman's cricket player
- Jesse Lumsden (born 1982), Canadian League Football League player and bobsledder
- Jimmy Lumsden (born 1947), Scottish football player
- John Lumsden (1869–1944), Irish physician
- John Lumsden (footballer) (1960–2016), Scottish footballer
- John McVeagh Lumsden (1823–1898), 19th century Canadian politician
- Louisa Lumsden (1840–1935)
- Maia Lumsden (born 1998), British tennis player
- Matthew Lumsden (1777–1835), Scottish orientalist
- Neil Lumsden (born 1952), former Canadian Football League player
- Norman Lumsden (1906–2001), British opera singer and actor
- General Peter Lumsden (1829–1918), 19th century British general in India
- Rachel Lumsden (1835-1908), British nurse and hospital manager
- Rachel Lumsden (artist) (1968-), British artist
- Richard Lumsden (born 1965), British actor
- Roddy Lumsden (1966–2020), Scottish poet
- Simon Lumsden, philosopher at University of New South Wales
- Todd Lumsden (born 1978), English football player and manager
- Tyler Lumsden (born 1983), baseball pitcher
- Viv Lumsden (born 1952), Scottish newsreader
