= John Nicholson (East India Company officer) =

Bengal Army officer (1822–1857)

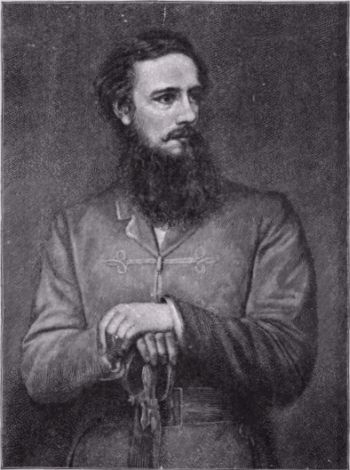
- Portrait of Nicholson
- Born: 11 December 1822; Dublin, Ireland
- Died: 23 September 1857 (aged 34); Delhi, Mughal Empire
- Burial place: Nicholson Cemetery, Delhi
- Military career
- Allegiance: East India Company
- Branch: Bengal Army
- Service years: 1839–1857
- Rank: Brigadier-General
- Unit: Bengal Native Infantry
- Conflicts: First Anglo-Afghan War; First Anglo-Sikh War; Second Anglo-Sikh War: Battle of Chillianwala; Battle of Gujrat; Indian Rebellion of 1857: Battle of Najafgarh; Siege of Delhi (1857) †
- Awards: Companion of the Order of the Bath
- Other work: Colonial administrator

Brigadier-General John Nicholson, CB (11 December 1822 – 23 September 1857) was an Ulster-Scot officer who rose to prominence during his career in British India. Born in Ireland, Nicholson moved to the Indian subcontinent at a young age and obtained a commission in the Bengal Army where he spent the majority of his career helping to expand the East India Company's territories in numerous conflicts, including the First Anglo-Afghan War, the First Anglo-Sikh War, and the Second Anglo-Sikh War. Nicholson created a legend for himself as a political officer under Henry Lawrence in the frontier provinces of British India, especially in the Punjab, and he was instrumental in the establishment of the North-West Frontier. Nicholson's most defining moment in his military career was his crucial role in suppressing the Indian Rebellion of 1857, a conflict in which he died.

A charismatic and authoritarian figure, Nicholson led a life whose controversial exploits have created a polarized legacy; contemporary descriptions of Nicholson presented him as the man who was crucial in suppressing the Indian Rebellion, while more recent historical accounts have described him as an "imperial psychopath" and "a violent, manic figure, a homosexual bully; an extreme egoist who was pleased to affect a laconic indifference to danger". His imposing physical appearance and noted deeds of valor and violence created an almost mythical status and even religious worship among the numerous tribes of the North-West Frontier whom Nicholson brought into the British Empire.

== Background ==
Nicholson was born on 11 December 1822 in Dublin, Ireland, the eldest son of Dr. Alexander Jaffray Nicholson and Clara Hogg, who were both descendants of Protestant Scottish settlers who had immigrated to Ireland as part of the Ulster Plantation. Dr. Nicholson died when John was eight after contracting an illness from one of his patients, after which the family moved to Lisburn, County Antrim. Nicholson was privately educated in Delgany and later attended the Royal School Dungannon, through the patronage of his maternal uncle, Sir James Weir Hogg, a successful East India Company lawyer and for some time Registrar of the Calcutta Supreme Court, and later a Member of Parliament. He left school soon after his sixteenth birthday and, as the eldest male in his family, obtained a cadetship in the East India Company army's Bengal Infantry thanks to his uncle. In early 1839, Nicholson spent several weeks under his uncle's tutorship in London, gaining an understanding of Indian matters, before departing Gravesend in mid February on the voyage to India where he would spend the majority of the rest of his life.

== Early career ==
On reaching India in July 1839, Nicholson was ordered to join the 41st Native Infantry at Benares on temporary attachment. After spending four months being drilled on the realities of military life, he was transferred in December, as a regular Ensign, to the 27th Native Infantry based at Ferozepore. Nicholson's arrival in India had been too late to participate in the initial invasion of Afghanistan as part of the First Anglo-Afghan War. However, in November 1840, the 27th Native Infantry was ordered up to relieve one of the infantry units already in Afghanistan as part of the British occupying force and marched through the Khyber Pass and into Afghanistan in January 1841.

After initially being garrisoned in Kabul, Nicholson's regiment was moved to Ghazni where he first met Neville Bowles Chamberlain who would become the first of the close band of friends Nicholson would form throughout his time in India. The British force's relatively peaceful occupation duties were soon superseded by Afghan anger against the rule of Shah Shujah Durrani, who had acceded to the throne thanks to British support. Following the outbreak of a revolt led by Wazir Akbar Khan, the main British garrison at Kabul was besieged and annihilated as it tried to retreat from Afghanistan in January 1842. This defeat left smaller British garrisons scattered throughout Afghanistan, including Nicholson's at Ghazni, besieged by Afghan tribesmen during the freezing winter of 1841. Although the garrison at Ghazni was well supplied, Nicholson's commander, Colonel Palmer, capitulated after the Afghans promised safe passage out of Afghanistan. The Afghans, however, immediately disregarded this promise and attacked the British. Nicholson was, with two other junior officers, separated from the rest of the garrison and led two companies of infantry in fortified buildings as they held off the Afghan attack for two days. The British soon ran out of food and water but Nicholson initially refused to surrender as it would mean abandoning his Indian sepoys to their fate. However, after being ordered to lay down his arms by Colonel Palmer, Nicholson was forced to watch in tears as his sepoys were slaughtered after refusing to convert to Islam.

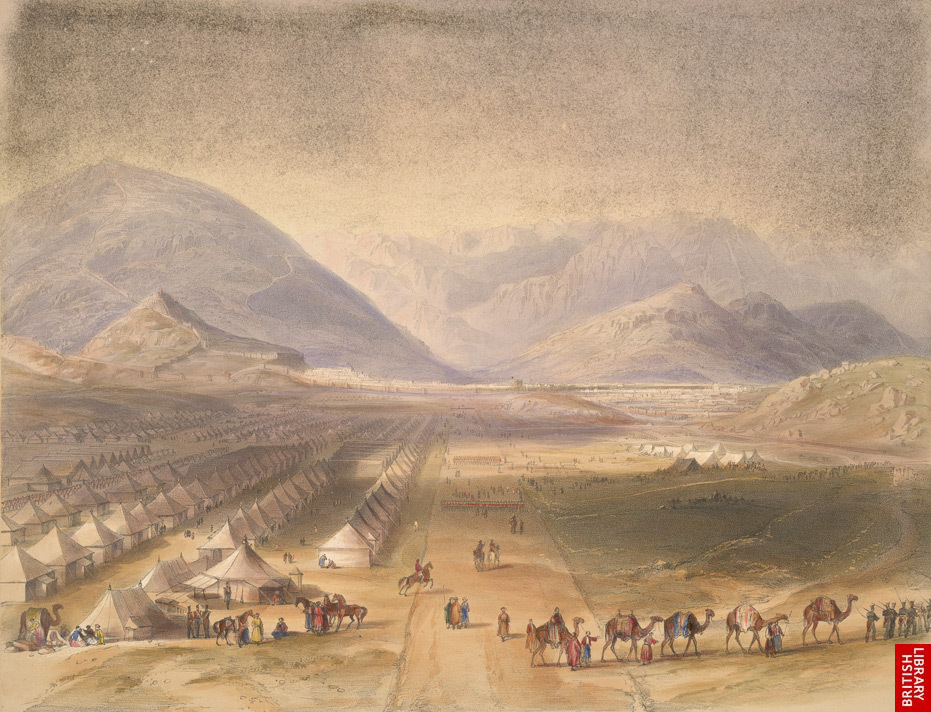
The British camp outside Kabul in 1842, where Nicholson was released from six months of Afghan imprisonment

Nicholson – together with ten other British Army officers – was held captive at Ghazni in a filthy, ordure-ridden, lice-infested cell between 10 March and 19 August 1842. With the approach of the British "Army of Retribution", the captive officers began to receive considerably better treatment and they were taken to join other British prisoners of war in Kabul on 24 August where they dined with the leader of the revolt, Akbar Khan. Following the Battle of Kabul, Nicholson and the rest of the British prisoners were released in September 1842, after six long months of captivity.

Despite the British victory, their position in Afghanistan was no longer tenable and the army began the difficult process of retreating back to Peshawar. Following the trail which was still littered with thousands of dead from the previous disastrous attempt at withdrawal by a British army in January, Nicholson's regiment was part of the final rear guard as the British force was harassed through the Khyber Pass. On 1 November 1842, Nicholson was briefly reunited with his younger brother Alexander, who had arrived in India only a few short months before and was now helping to escort the British force through the pass. Alexander's unit was ambushed and overwhelmed two days later and it was the nineteen-year-old Nicholson who was the first to find the mutilated body of his younger brother; his severed genitalia had been stuffed in his mouth. This disturbing experience, as well as his experience of the Afghan War as a whole, is said to have deeply affected Nicholson and left him with "an intense feeling of hatred" of Afghans and the entirety of India. Nicholson's first experience of war had also, however, instilled a "near-messianic sense of destiny" on him and he now believed it was his duty to spread Christian civilization into what he considered a "heathen" land.

Following the return of the British forces from Afghanistan, Nicholson was first stationed at Peshawar, and later for two years at Moradabad. These two years were largely uneventful for Nicholson who concerned himself mainly with military matters and mastering the Urdu language. In November 1845, on passing his Urdu vernacular examination, Nicholson was posted to the Delhi Field Force which was being organised at that time, as the threat of a war with the Sikh Kingdom of the Punjab loomed near.

== Anglo-Sikh Wars and the Punjab ==
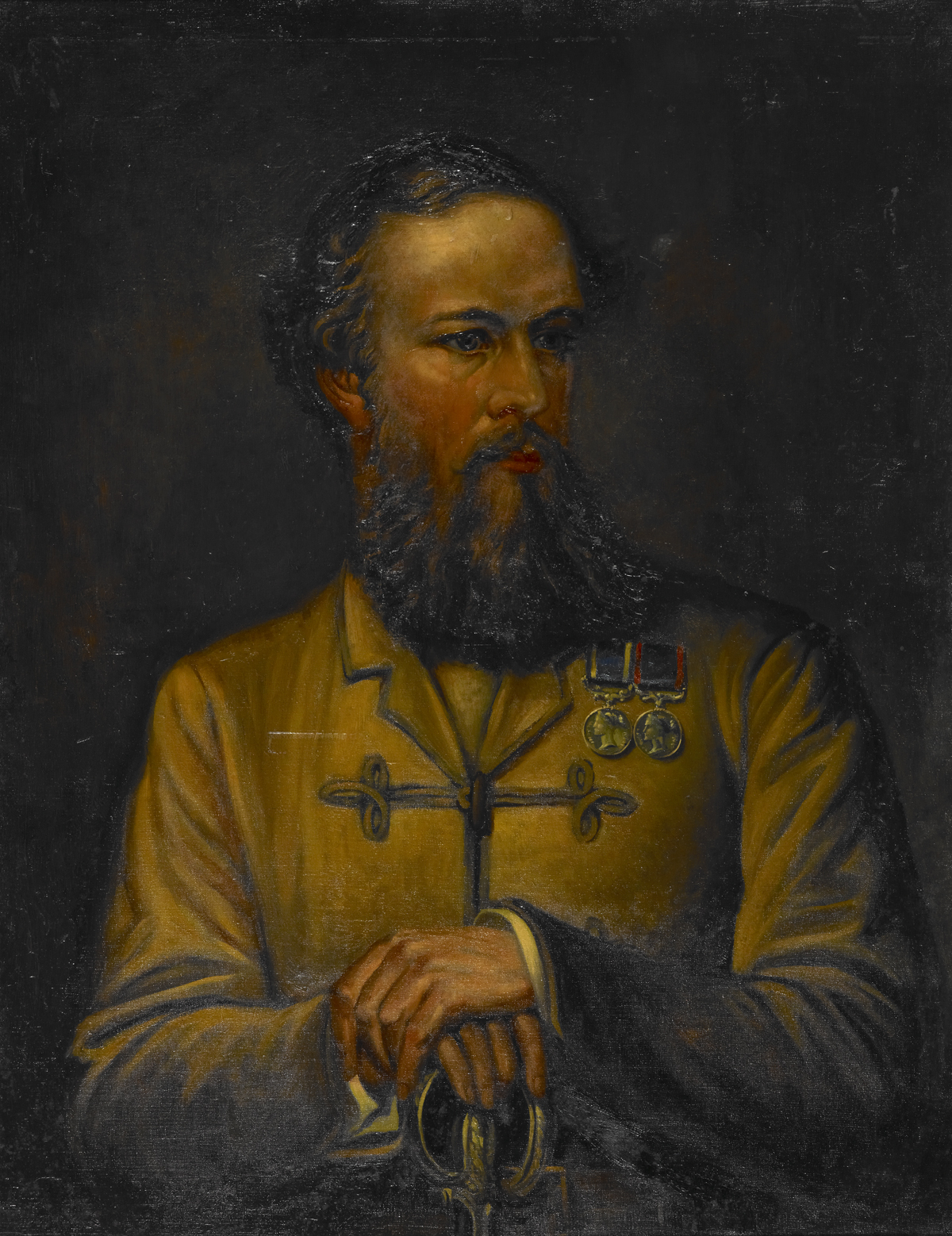
A portrait of John Nicholson as he would have appeared in his role as a political officer on the North-West Frontier

Upon the outbreak of the First Anglo-Sikh War in December 1845, Nicholson was serving as a staff officer in the commissariat department of Sir Hugh Gough's field force which marched into the Punjab. In this role, Nicholson's main responsibility throughout the war was keeping Gough's force well supplied with provisions and ammunition. Following the decisive British victory at the Battle of Sobraon in 1846, Nicholson was taken under the wing of Henry Lawrence along with several other similarly aged officers such as Herbert Edwardes, James Abbott, Neville Chamberlain, Frederick Mackeson, Patrick Alexander Vans Agnew, William Hodson, Reynell Taylor, Harry Burnett Lumsden, Henry Daly, John Coke, this group was known as Henry Lawrence's "Young Men". As part of this small band of young and driven men, Nicholson was given much power as a political officer on the North-West Frontier. His first posting in this new role was in July 1846 to the princely state of Jammu and Kashmir where he was to help solidify the rule of the British-installed Maharaja, Gulab Singh. Singh, however, was not a popular ruler in Kashmir and Nicholson took part in the suppression of a revolt against his rule. He spent the remainder of 1846 isolated in the Kashmir Valley serving as the sole British advisor to Singh at his court in Srinagar. To his relief, Nicholson was recalled to Lahore by Lawrence in February 1847. Nicholson's next significant assignment was helping James Abbot win over the various tribes of the Hazara region which he did by partaking in a daring nighttime raid against the Tahirkheli tribe's mountain stronghold, after which Nicholson and Abbott would form a strong friendship.

The murders of Patrick Vans Agnew and Lieutenant William Anderson on 20 April 1848 signalled the beginning of a Punjab-wide Sikh rebellion which soon became the Second Anglo-Sikh War. Initially, the East India Company was unprepared to deploy their army to the Punjab which meant that their political officers, including Nicholson, were completely isolated and effectively on their own in trying to maintain the British presence in the Punjab. It was in this vulnerable position that Nicholson was to display his soon to be characteristic nature of acting decisively and on his own initiative. He left Peshawar with a troop of irregular Pakthun horsemen and rode straight for the vital fort at Attock which, if controlled by the enemy, could sever the British line of communication. Upon arrival to the fort at first light, Nicholson rode straight past the stunned Sikh sentries guarding the main gate. When the Sikh sepoys further inside the fort raised their weapons against him, Nicholson leaped from his horse and wrestled the musket away from the nearest sepoy before shouting at them to lay down their arms and leave the fort, which the stunned Sikh garrison promptly did. This action, which was to become the first of Nicholson's famed exploits among the Sikhs, had enabled him to secure the vital fort without firing a single shot. Nicholson followed up this action just days later when he heard a Sikh infantry regiment were moving through the Margalla Hills in order to join the rebellion. Nicholson left Attock with his trusted irregulars and met the Sikh force camped at a Muslim cemetery. Nicholson rode up to the enemy camp and demanded to speak with their Colonel whom he gave one hour to submit their loyalty to him and be spared or else be destroyed "to a man". The Sikhs argued for an hour in front of the imposing figure of Nicholson, who sat motionless on his horse for the entire duration. Upon the hour mark, the Sikhs returned to Nicholson and declared their willingness to submit to his authority, thus cementing the growing legend of Nicholson among the Sikh population.

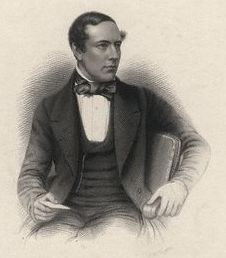
A clean-shaven John Nicholson in an engraving of his only known photograph, taken while he was on leave in January 1852

Nicholson and the rest of the British political officers throughout the Punjab spent the next few weeks attempting to fight the tide of the rebellion, but still awaiting support from Company troops and with the intervention of the Afghans into the conflict, they inevitably suffered a number of setbacks and Nicholson himself was seriously wounded while trying to storm a tower held by the Sikhs. By September 1848, Abbott and Nicholson were effectively on the run from the Sikh army and could only undertake limited action against them. However, with the arrival of the Company Field Army, which included Nicholson's younger brother Charles, to Lahore in November, the tide turned and the British were soon able to undertake offensive actions with Nicholson's irregular troops acting as the army's reconnaissance force and securing its supply lines. Nicholson fought in the subsequent Battle of Chillianwala and witnessed the Sikhs' final surrender at the Battle of Gujrat before being tasked to chase the retreating Afghan army all the way back to the Khyber Pass. Following the complete annexation of the Punjab under the administration of the East India Company, Nicholson was appointed the new Deputy Commissioner at Rawalpindi. He soon set about imposing "law and order" in the region. In one incident, after placing a bounty on a particularly troublesome local robber chieftain failed to result in his arrest, Nicholson rode out alone to the man's village and demanded the chieftain surrender. When the chieftain refused this offer, Nicholson fought and killed him before decapitating his body. He then placed the man's head on his desk as a warning to all other criminals who may be tempted to commit similar violations.

By 1849, Nicholson had spent ten years in India and was entitled to return home for a year's leave. During his time back in Europe, Nicholson served as the best man at his close friend Herbert Edwardes's wedding and travelled throughout Europe extensively. On his return to India in January 1852, Lawrence appointed Nicholson as the new Deputy Commissioner of the largely lawless Bannu area. In this role, Nicholson was ruthless in bringing peace and order to the region with a zero tolerance attitude on crime or any perceived disrespect shown towards the colonial government, often using flogging or other similar methods to both punish and humiliate any who dared infringe the law. At first, he was feared for his foul temper and authoritarian manner which underpinned his tyrant-style rule, but Nicholson soon gained the respect of the Afghan and North Punjabi tribes in the area for his fairhandedness and sense of honour as well as his almost complete elimination of crime. The respect that Nicholson had first gained from the Sikh people and then the Punjabi tribes became religious worship as the "Nikal Seyn" cult developed, which worshiped Nicholson as a saint-like figure who brought justice to the oppressed by punishing the strong. Amazingly, this cult survived in surprising forms and ways in some remoter parts of North-West Pakistan, into the 21st century. Rather than be flattered by this religious devotion, Nicholson found his Christian beliefs offended by the worship and would promptly whip any of the devotees who publicly practised this cult in his presence. In 1855, at just the age of just thirty-four, Nicholson became the youngest brigadier-general in the Bengal Army. Nicholson was transferred to Peshawar in late 1856 to serve as the District Commissioner.

== Indian Mutiny ==
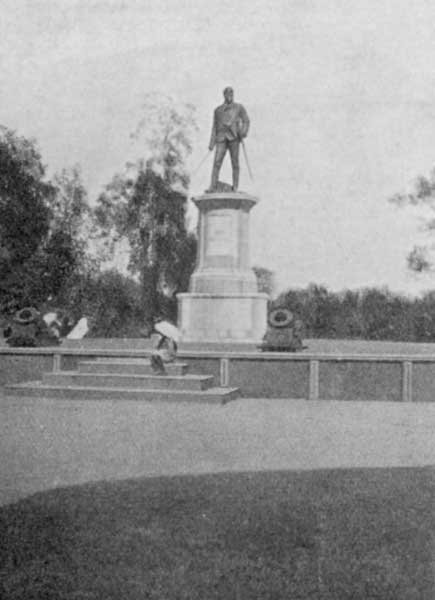
The statue of John Nicholson which stood in Delhi until Indian independence when it was removed to Dungannon, Northern Ireland

Nicholson was dining with his friend Edwardes at Peshawar on the evening of 11 May 1857 when news reached them of the beginning of the Indian Mutiny in Delhi. Nicholson and Edwardes immediately planned to form a 'strong movable column' consisting of European and irregular troops which would be able to move and meet any outbreaks in the Punjab. Nicholson's calm response to the outbreak of violence was in no small part due to the distrust he had long held for the Bengal Army, telling his fellow officers; "For years I have watched the army and felt sure they only wanted the opportunity to try their strength with us. Mutiny is like smallpox. It spreads quickly and must be crushed as quickly as possible." Nicholson was awoken on 21 May to the news that the 55th Regiment of Bengal Native Infantry had mutinied at Nowshera. After taking part in the successful disarming of the remaining five regular Bengal regiments at Peshawar, Nicholson accompanied the force dispatched to Nowshera to deal with the 55th. Although the mutineers of the 55th retreated from Nowshera after hearing of the approaching force, Nicholson, upon his grey charger, was able to give chase with his mounted police and cavalry and successfully charged the mutinous sepoys. Nicholson continued to chase down the fleeing sepoys until nightfall, killing over 120 of them and capturing a similar number. Despite initial plans to kill all of the captured mutineers, Nicholson successfully pleaded with his superiors to grant clemency to the Sikh and youngest prisoners. His superiors concurred and executed forty by blowing them from a gun.

One famous story recounted by Charles Allen in Soldier Sahibs is of a night during the Rebellion when Nicholson strode into the British mess tent at Jullunder, coughed to attract the attention of the officers, then said, "I am sorry, gentlemen, to have kept you waiting for your dinner, but I have been hanging your cooks." He had been told that the regimental chefs had poisoned the soup with aconite. When they refused to taste it for him, he force fed it to a monkey – and when it expired on the spot, he proceeded to hang the cooks from a nearby tree without a trial. Nicholson also called for the mutineers to be punished severely. He proposed an Act endorsing a 'new kind of death for the murderers and dishonourers of our women', suggesting, 'flaying alive, impalement or burning,' and commenting further, 'I would inflict the most excruciating tortures I could think of on them with a perfectly easy conscience.'

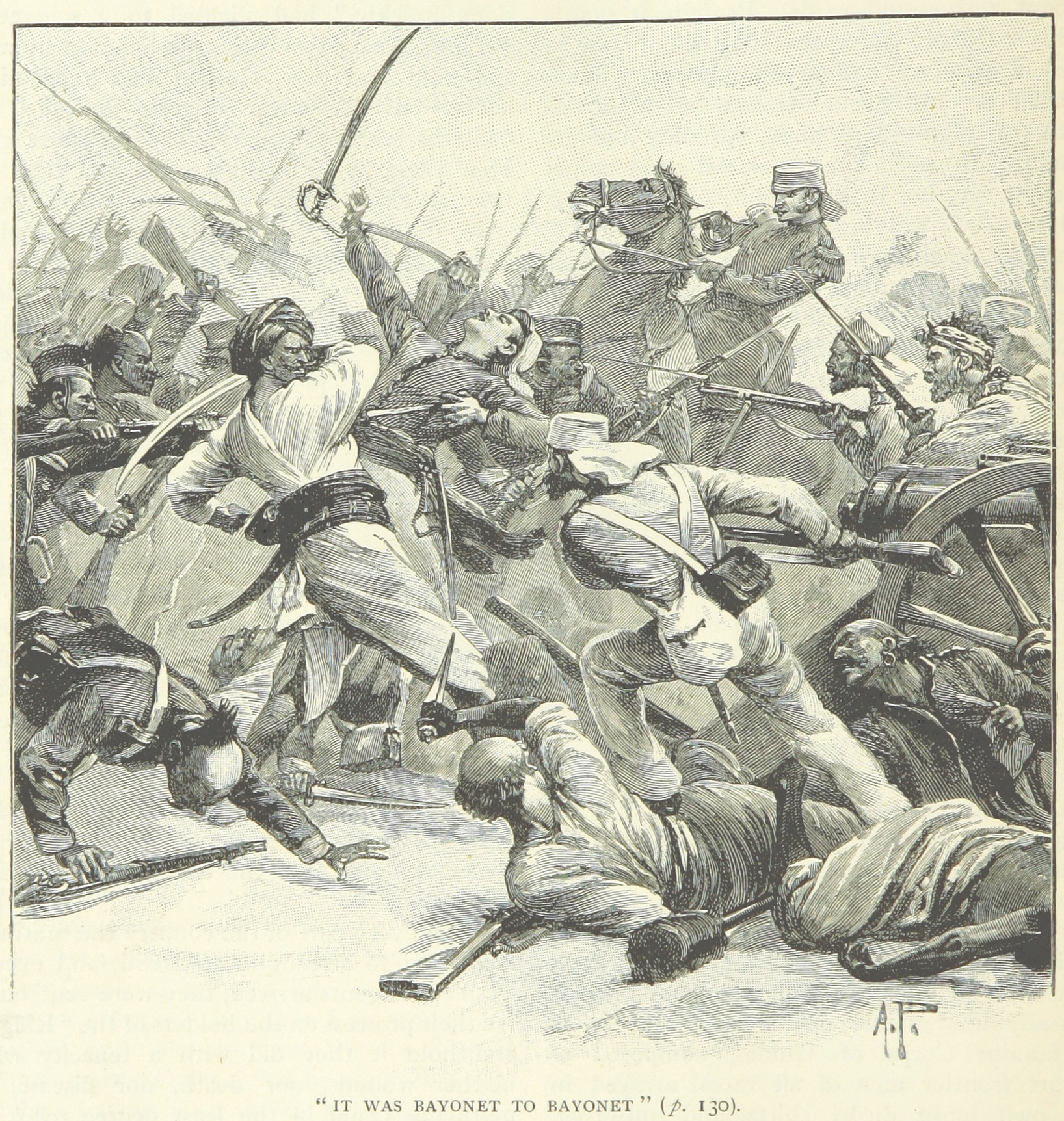
Nicholson led his troops to a significant victory over the sepoy army at the Battle of Najafgarh.

After replacing Neville Chamberlain as the commander of the Movable Column, Nicholson left Peshawar on 14 June with his personal bodyguard of frontier horsemen, who took no pay and served the British only through a personal devotion to their commander. Nicholson's first act as commander was to disarm any native regiments in his column that he suspected of disloyalty. On 11 July, Nicholson managed to intercept a force of mutineers that had risen at Sialkot and murdered their British officers and civilians. After he had defeated them in battle, the mutineers retreated to an island on the Ravi River and Nicholson was forced to wait until 15 July before he could gather enough boats to launch an attack on the island. Nicholson's attack gained complete surprise and the British soon overwhelmed and routed the remaining sepoys. The column reached Delhi on 14 August, providing much-needed support to the besieging British force. Nicholson found the British forces at Delhi to be in a sorry state, with many sick and wounded and demoralized from the ineffectual leadership of Colonel Archdale Wilson. However, Nicholson's already legendary status with dealing with the mutiny proved a major boost to the British troops who believed the young and aggressive Nicholson to be the antithesis to their old and weary commanders who had mismanaged the outbreak of the mutiny.

Despite not being in command, Nicholson immediately began inspecting the British positions and formulating his plan to capture the city. It did not take long for Nicholson to come to the conclusion that Wilson "was not at all equal to the crisis" and would not be able to command the assault on the city. Wilson's strategy was based upon waiting for the arrival of a siege train from Calcutta before he would launch the assault. However, the rebels dispatched a 6,000 strong force from Delhi to intercept the British train before it could reach the city.

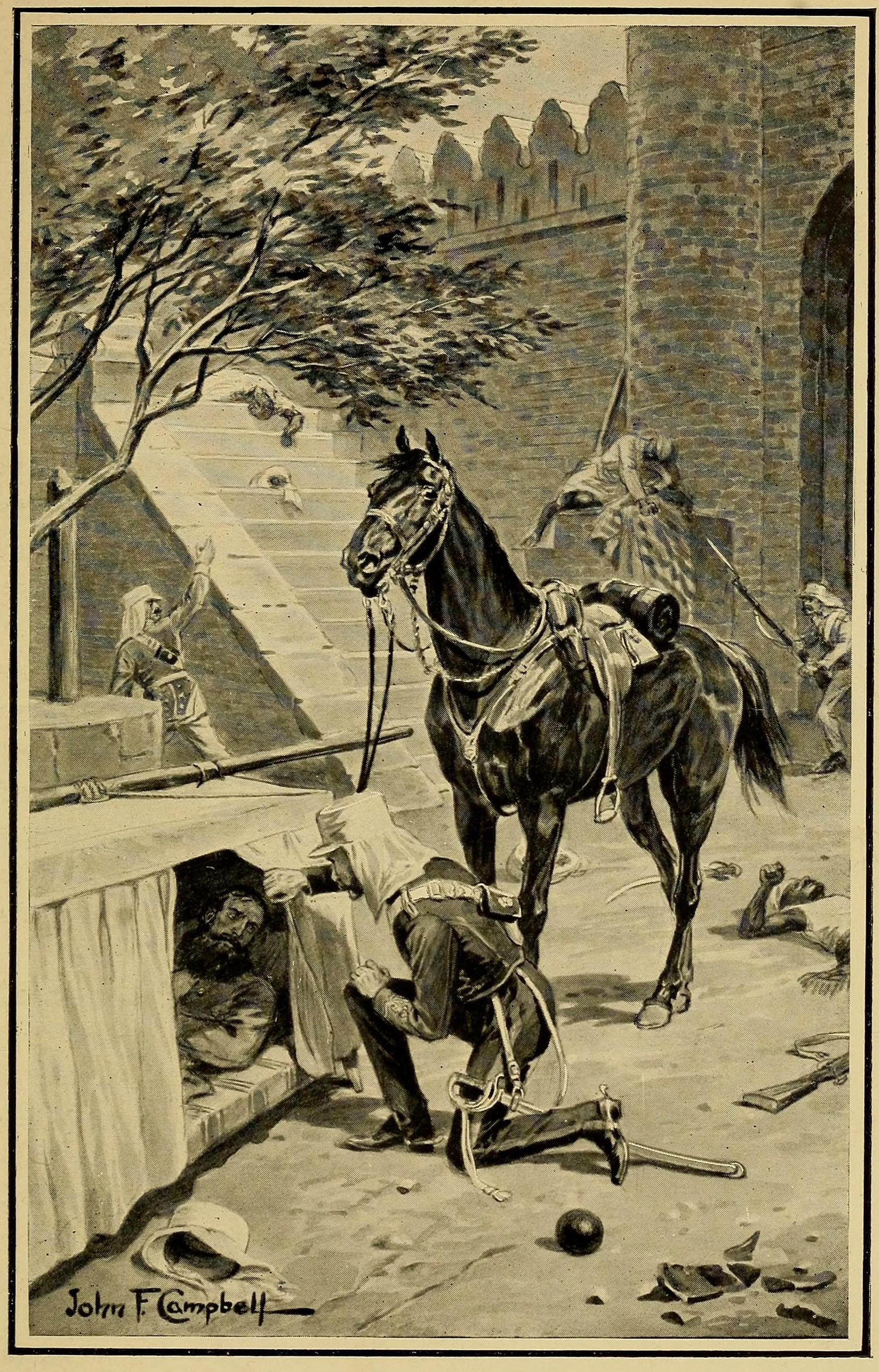
Lieutenant Frederick Roberts finding the mortally wounded General Nicholson by the Kashmir Gate during the Siege of Delhi in 1857

In response, Nicholson led a force approximately 2,000 strong to find and destroy the rebels before they could destroy the British siege train and jeopardize the entire British effort to capture the city. Nicholson's force managed to reach the rebels first and in the subsequent Battle of Najafgarh, Nicholson personally led his troops in routing the rebel force, thus ensuring the arrival of the siege train and a hero's return to the British at Delhi.

Following the arrival of the siege train, Wilson finally relented to the pressure from the other officers and permitted the assault to be launched at sunrise on 14 September. Nicholson was to lead the first troops attempting to storm the breach at the Kashmir Bastion. In the face of withering fire from the defending Indians, Nicholson led his column to the wall and was the first of his men to scale the escarpment made by the breach. He then helped clear the remainder of the walls of the Mori bastion but became separated from his column whose assault had become bogged down in the face of fierce resistance as they advanced further into the city. Upon hearing of his column's plight and that a full-scale retreat looked likely, Nicholson rushed to the streets below and began rallying his men. Drawing his sword, Nicholson called for his men to follow him as he led a charge down a narrow alley through which his troops had been unable to advance in order to capture the Burn Bastion. Just as he looked back to urge his men to follow his lead, Nicholson was hit from a shot fired by a sepoy sniper on a rooftop.

The mortally wounded Nicholson was dragged back by troops of the 1st Bengal Fusiliers and initially refused to be taken to the field hospital until the city had fallen but eventually relented and was placed in a doolie. However, in the growing chaos of the faltering attack, the doolie carriers left the injured Nicholson by the side of the road near the Kashmir Gate. A short time later, Lieutenant Frederick Roberts found the injured Nicholson who told him "I am dying; there is no hope for me." Despite the wounding of Nicholson, the British managed to hold their gains in the city. Upon hearing of Wilson's faltering nerve and contemplation of retreat, Nicholson, who lay dying in the field hospital, reached for his pistol and famously declared "Thank God that I still have the strength yet to shoot him, if necessary." Nicholson managed to remain alive until hearing the news that the British had finally taken Delhi, before succumbing to his wounds on 23 September, nine days after he had led the assault on the city. He was buried the following day in a cemetery between the Kashmir Gate and Ludlow Castle.

== Legacy ==
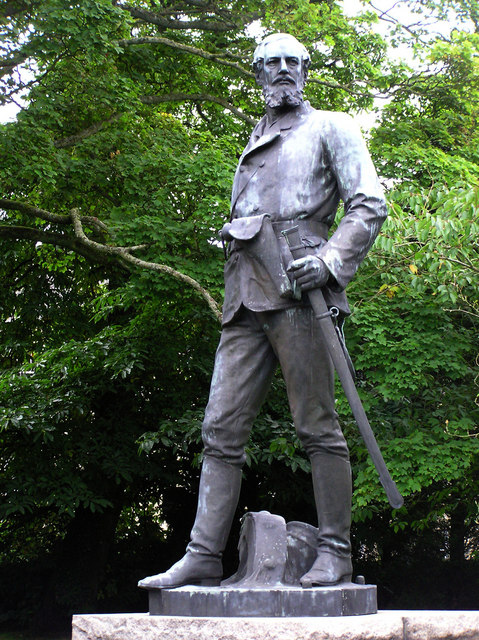
John Nicholson statue in the grounds of the Royal School, Dungannon, Northern Ireland

Following his death, Nicholson was immortalized by the Victorians as one of the gallant figures of the Indian Rebellion, and he became known as the "Hero of Delhi" and the "Lion of the Punjab". In the decades following the events of the rebellion, Nicholson became a household name and his life was widely eulogized by late-nineteenth-century historians who espoused Nicholson as a martyr of the British Empire with the historian John William Kaye describing Nicholson as "one of the purest hearts and one of the soundest Heads in all our Christian community". However, in recent decades the legacy of Nicholson has been reappraised in context of his harsh attitudes towards crime and punishment. British journalist Stuart Flinders wrote that "Nicholson's name has become a byword for brutality and racism". The reexamination of Nicholson's violent and quite often controversial, even for his time, treatment of those who provoked his wrath has prompted the Scottish historian William Dalrymple to describe Nicholson as "the great imperial psychopath".

Nicholson's life and death inspired books, ballads and generations of young boys to join the army and he is referenced in numerous literary works, including Rudyard Kipling's Kim and in George MacDonald Fraser's satirical adventure novel Flashman in the Great Game in which Harry Flashman meets Nicholson on the road between Bombay and Jhansi just before the rebellion, and describes Nicholson as "The downiest bird in all India and could be trusted with anything, money even." He also appears as one of the main characters in James Leasor's novel about the Indian Rebellion, Follow the Drum, which describes his death in some detail and features heavily in the same author's history of the siege, The Red Fort (1956).

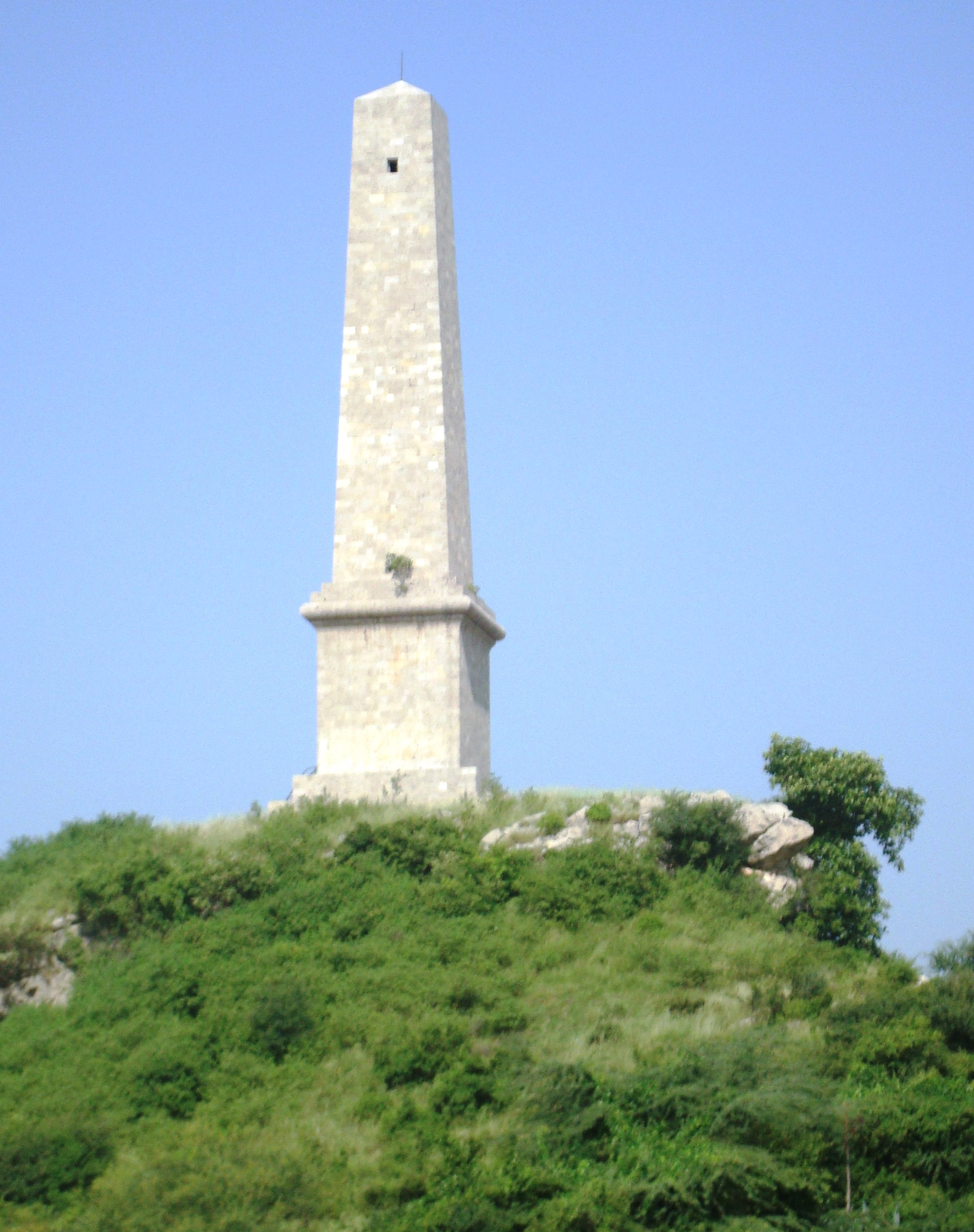
Nicholson's Obelisk at the Margalla Pass, Pakistan

Nicholson's legacy is also represented through the numerous monuments and statues which stand in his honour in both India and Ireland. These include two statues in Northern Ireland, one in the centre of Lisburn where Nicholson lived and another at the Royal School Dungannon, his old school. Nicholson's obelisk, a large granite memorial, was erected in 1868 in the Margalla hills near Taxila as a monument to pay tribute to his valour.

Nicholson never married. He told his mother that marriage would not suit his Government appointment, but most modern scholars have assumed that he was homosexual; one stating that "Boys were certainly John Nicholson's principal solace". The most significant people in his life were his fellow Punjab administrators, especially his superior, Sir Henry Lawrence, whom Nicholson regarded as a father figure and who was deeply affected by Lawrence's death shortly before his. Nicholson's closest friend was Herbert Edwardes, who shared his deep Christian faith. At Bannu, Nicholson used to ride one hundred and twenty miles every weekend to spend a few days with Edwardes, and lived in his beloved friend's house for some time when Edwardes's wife Emma was in England. Edwardes and his wife soon became a sense of comfort and spiritual guidance to an often isolated Nicholson. At his deathbed, he dictated a message to Edwardes saying, "Tell him that, if at this moment a good fairy were to grant me a wish, my wish would be to have him here next to my mother." The love between him and Edwardes made them, as Edwardes's wife later described it "more than brothers in the tenderness of their whole lives". Upon learning of Nicholson's death, Edwardes wrote to Neville Chamberlain, eulogizing his friend as "So undaunted, so noble, so tender, so good, so stern to evil, so single-minded, so generous, so heroic and yet so modest. I never saw another like him, and never expect to do so. And to have had him as a brother, and now to lose him in the prime of his life. It is an inexpressible and irreparable grief."

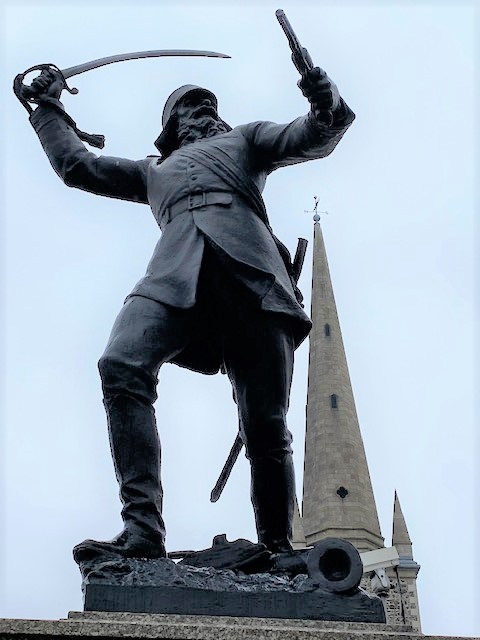
John Nicholson centenary memorial (1922), Lisburn

On the day that the last Lord Lieutenant of Ireland formally ceded control of Dublin Castle to the government of the Irish Free State, 16 January 1922, a sword-wielding figure of John Nicholson was unveiled in Lisburn's Market Square. For Sir James Craig, the first prime minister of a Northern Ireland, and for other dignitaries speaking, the East India Company Brigadier was "a symbol of the defence of Empire in Ireland as well as India."

A memorial relief (by John Henry Foley), placed by his mother sixty years before in the town's Cathedral, depicts the final assault upon Delhi's Red Fort. The inscription reads in part:

Rare gifts had marked him for great things in peace and war. He had an iron mind and frame, a terrible courage, an indominable will [...]. Soldier and civilian, he was a tower of strength; the type of the conquering hero. Most fitly, in the great siege of Delhi, he [... dealt] the death blow to the greatest danger that ever threatened the British Empire.

== See also ==
- Sir Henry Lawrence
- James Abbott
- Herbert Benjamin Edwardes

== Bibliography ==
- Aldrich, Robert, Colonialism and Homosexuality, Routledge, 2008, ISBN 9781134644599
- Flinders, Stuart, Cult of a Dark Hero: Nicholson of Delhi, Bloomsbury, London 2018; ISBN 9781838608323

== Sources ==
- Flinders, Stuart, Cult of a Dark Hero: Nicholson of Delhi, 2019, Bloomsbury, ISBN 9781788312363
- Allen, Charles (2002), 'Soldier-Sahibs: The Men who made the North-West Frontier, London: Abacus/Time Warner Books UK, ISBN 978-0-349-11456-9
- Dalrymple, William (2009), The Last Mughal, Bloomsbury, ISBN 978-1 4088-0092-8
- David, Saul (2002), The Indian Mutiny, Penguin Books, ISBN 978-0-14-100554-6
- Flinders, Stuart (2019). "'Lion of the Punjab' or 'Great Imperial Psychopath'". History Ireland. 27 (1): 24–27. JSTOR 26565998.
- Malik, Salahuddin (1973). "Nineteenth Century Approaches to the Indian Mutiny". Journal of Asian History. 7 (2): 95–127. JSTOR 41930097.
- Trotter, Lionel James (1897), The Life of John Nicholson: Soldier and Administrator, J. Murray, London
- Oxford Dictionary of National Biography
- McCracken, Donal P. (2018), 'Nicholson: How an angry Irishman became the hero of Delhi', The History Press Ireland, Stroud, UK, ISBN 978-0-7509-8810-0.
