= Henry Lawrence's "Young Men" =

Henry Lawrence's "Young Men", also known as "the Paladins of the Punjaub", were a group of East India Company officers sent to act as "advisers" to the Sikhs after the First Anglo-Sikh War in 1846. In the words of George Lawrence, his duties were "to act as a friendly adviser to the native officials". They served under the command of Sir Henry Lawrence, initially the Agent to the Governor General and later also the Resident at Lahore. His brother, John Lawrence, also played a role. It is also known as the Punjab School of Administration.

Collectively these men laid the foundations of British rule in the Punjab and Northwest Frontier between the First Anglo-Sikh War and the Indian Rebellion of 1857.

== Background ==
Following the successful defeat of the Maratha Empire in the Third Anglo-Maratha War, the East India Company was able to expand its operations westwards largely unchecked. This created a new frontier for the company which brought them into competition with the expanding Sikh Empire under Maharaja Ranjit Singh. At the same time, Russia was empire building in Asia, and the British government became fearful of the Russian threats to its commercial interests in India and central Asia. The British viewed Afghanistan as a potential protectorate, behind a series of further buffer states in central Asia and Persia designed to protect British India. However, to gain access to Afghanistan, a route would be required through Sind and the Punjab.

The death of Ranjit Singh in 1839 marked a period of instability within the Sikh Empire. To counter the threat to British territories along the border, the East India Company increased its military strength near the border with a new cantonment in Firozpur. However this act, viewed together with the recent conquest of Sindh in 1843, was viewed with great distrust by the Sikhs. This led to a breakdown in diplomatic relations and the outbreak of the First Anglo-Sikh War in 1845.

The British marched unopposed into Lahore on 20 February 1846 and a peace treaty, known as the Treaty of Lahore was drawn up by Frederick Currie. A supplement to the treaty stipulated that a British force would remain in Lahore until no longer than the end of the year "for the purpose of protecting the person of the Maharajah and the inhabitants of the City of Lahore, during the reorganisation of the Sikh Army. Towards the end of 1846, the Treaty of Bhyrowal was ratified, which provided that a Resident British officer, with an efficient establishment of assistants, was to be appointed by the Governor-General to remain at Lahore, with "full authority to direct and control all matters in every Department of the State".

== Paladins of the Punjaub ==
The new Resident was to be Henry Lawrence, who had assisted Currie in the drafting of the Lahore Treaty. Lawrence would subsequently hand pick a number of assistants to carry out his orders. These included contemporaries such as James Abbott, Frederick Mackeson and his brothers George Lawrence and John Lawrence, however the majority were junior officers in their twenties taken directly from the Bengal Army. Some of the most prominent officers selected by Lawrence, were those he had served with in the First Anglo-Sikh War. The Battle of Sobraon alone included Herbert Edwardes, William Hodson and Harry "Joe" Lumsden.

Lawrence was often on the lookout for new recruits, and he kept a notebook to keep track of any prospects. Lawrence nurtured his proteges, and they trusted him. The young men in this brotherhood shared a vocation with Lawrence, Paladins at the court of their mentor and master.

The murders in Multan of Patrick Vans Agnew and Lt. Anderson, sparked the Second Anglo-Sikh War and led to the annexation of the Punjab.

== "Young Men" ==
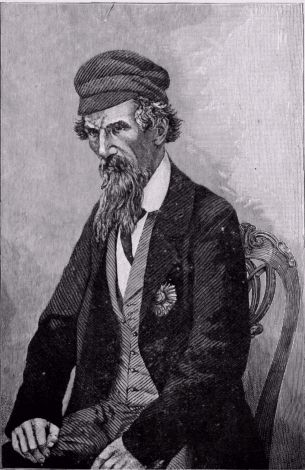
Henry Montgomery Lawrence, after photograph by Ahmed Ali Khan, 1857. NPG

- James Abbott
- Lewin Bowring
- Neville Bowles Chamberlain
- John Coke
- Henry Coxe
- Henry Daly
- Herbert Edwardes
- William Hodson
- George Lawrence
- Harry "Joe" Lumsden
- Frederick Mackeson
- Philip Melvill
- John Nicholson
- Richard Pollock
- Reynell Taylor
- Patrick Alexander Vans Agnew
