= Henry Walter Bellew =

Indian-born British medical officer

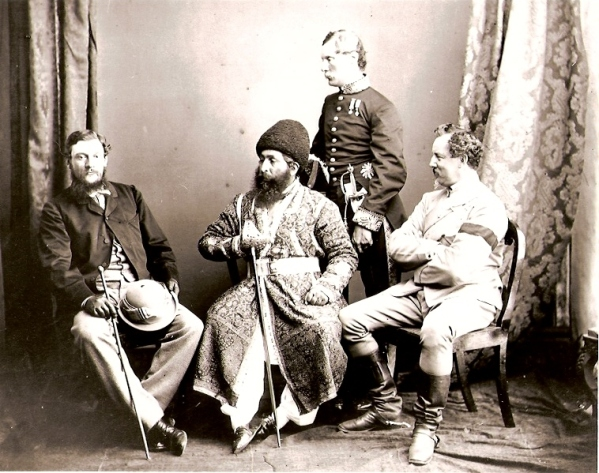
Dr. Bellew as an interpreter (left) with Amir Sher Ali Khan (centre), Colonel Frederick Pollock (standing) and Colonel Crawford Trotter Chamberlain (right) in an 1869 photograph in the British Library

Henry Walter Bellew MRCP (30 August 1834 – 26 July 1892) was an Indian-born British medical officer who worked in Afghanistan. He wrote several books based on his explorations in the region during the course of his army career and also studied and wrote on the languages and culture of Afghanistan.

== Life ==
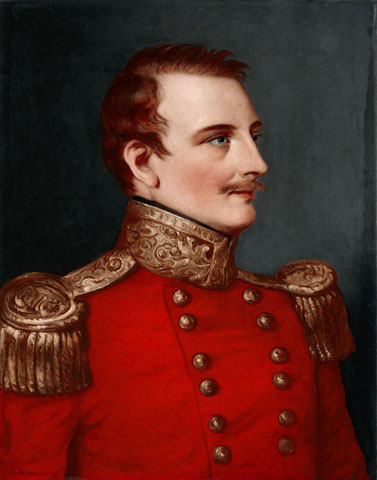
Portrait of Bellew's father in 1841, National Army Museum, London

Bellew was born at Nusserabad in India on 30 August 1834, son of Captain Henry Walter Bellew of the Bengal army, assistant quartermaster-general attached to the Kabul army who was killed at Jalalabad in the disastrous retreat of 1842. He joined as a medical student at St. George's Hospital, London in 1852 (where he studied under Caesar Hawkins), and admitted a member of the Royal College of Surgeons of England in 1855. He served in the Crimean War during the winter of 1854–5, and on 14 November 1855 he was gazetted assistant-surgeon in the Bengal medical service, becoming surgeon in 1867, and deputy surgeon-general in 1881.

He was with the Bengal Army, assistant surgeon in the Bengal Medical Service, and was posted along with Harry Burnett Lumsden and Peter Lumsden on the 1857 mission to Afghanistan. He was in Mardan with the Corps of Guides in the 1860s, and was then in Peshawar as a civil surgeon. He was appointed political officer at Kabul. During the 1857 rebellion, he was in Afghanistan and when he visited Kandahar along with the Lumsdens there were questions on whether the three should be put to death from the son of Dost Mohammad Ghulam Hyder. Bellew's work in treating sick and injured Afghans however ensured that the three were spared. Bellew however regretted that he was away from the action in India. He became Civil Surgeon of Peshawar and during this time he produced a dictionary of the Pashto language. In 1860 he was employed as an interpreter for discussions between Lord Mayo-General and Amir Sher Ali at Ambala. In 1871 he accompanied Frederick Richard Pollock to Sistan and wrote From the Indus to the Tigris which included a note on the grammar of the Brahui language, the only Dravidian language outside the Indian peninsula.

"As an author Dr. Bellew had the merit of clear and plain speaking."

In 1873-1874 Bellew participated in the Second Yarkand Mission led by Thomas Douglas Forsyth. The main goal of the expedition was to meet Yakub Beg, the ruler of Chinese Turkestan. He was accompanied on the mission by John Biddulph, Ferdinand Stoliczka (who died on that expedition), Thomas Edward Gordon, Henry Trotter, and R. A. Champman.

In 1879 he was chosen for appointment as chief political officer at Kabul, however he fell ill and the appointment went to Lepel Griffin. During this time, he wrote a book on The Races of Afghanistan (1880) and retired from service in 1886. He wrote numerous books and contributed articles to the Royal Asiatic Society. Apart from numerous works in English, he also wrote booklets in Punjabi on vaccination and cholera. He was awarded a diploma of honour at the ninth Congress of Orientalists in 1891.

He died at Farnham Royal, Buckinghamshire, on 26 July 1892, and his body was cremated at Brookwood.

== Family ==
Bellew married Isabel, sister of General Sir George MacGregor; they had two daughters and one son, Robert Walter Dillon, a captain in the 16th Lancers. A collection of about 112 albumen photographs made by Bellew were presented to the British Library in 1948 by his daughter Ida C. Turnbull.

== Works ==
- Journal of a Political Mission to Afghanistan in 1857 (1862)
- A General Report on the Yusufzais (1864)
- A Grammar of the Pukkhto Or Pukshto Language (1867)
- Record of the March of the Mission to Seistan Under the Command of F. R. Pollock (1873)
- From the Indus to the Tigris (1874) (also at Project Gutenberg)
- The history of Káshgharia (1875)
- Kashmir and Kashghar: A Narrative of the Journey of the Embassy to Kashghar in 1873-74 (1875)
- Afghanistan and the Afghans : being a brief review of the history of the country and account of its people, with a special reference to the present crisis and war with the Amir Sher Ali Khan (1879)
- Races of Afghanistan (1880)
- ''The History of Cholera in India from 1862 to 1881'' (1885)
- A short practical treatise on the nature, causes, and treatment of cholera (1887)
- A Dictionary of the Pukkhto or Pushto Language, in which the words are traced to their sources in the Indian and Persian Languages Part 2
- An Inquiry into the Ethnography of Afghanistan (1891)
