= Bulac =

Bulac or BULAC may refer to:

- Bibliothèque universitaire des langues et civilisations (BULAC), an oriental academic library in France
- Bulac River, a river in Romania
