= Lumsden =

Lumsden may refer to:

== Places ==
- Lumsden, Newfoundland and Labrador, Canada, a town
- Rural Municipality of Lumsden No. 189, Saskatchewan, Canada
  - Lumsden, Saskatchewan, Canada, a town
- Lumsden (provincial electoral district), Saskatchewan, Canada
- Lumsden, New Zealand, a town
- Lumsden, Aberdeenshire, Scotland, a village

== People ==
- Lumsden (surname)
- Lumsden Barkway (1878–1968), Anglican bishop
- Lumsden Hare (1874–1964), Irish actor
- Clan Lumsden, a Lowland Scottish clan

== Other uses ==
- Lumsden baronets, a title in the Baronetage of the United Kingdom

== See also ==
- Lumsden Heritage Trust, formed in 2013 in New Zealand
