= General Pollock =

General Pollock may refer to:

- Edwin A. Pollock (1899–1982), U.S. Marine Corps general
- Frederick Richard Pollock (1827–1899), British Indian Army major general
- Gale Pollock (fl. 1970s–2000s), U.S. Army major general
- Sir George Pollock, 1st Baronet (1786–1872), British Indian Army general
- Robert Pollok (British Army officer) (1884–1979), British Army major general

== See also ==
- Attorney General Pollock (disambiguation)
