= Fort William College =

Academy of oriental studies and a centre of learning

Fort William College (also known as the College of Fort William) was an academy of oriental studies and a centre of learning, founded on 18 August 1800 by Lord Wellesley, then Governor-General of British India, located within the Fort William complex in Calcutta. Wellesley started the Fort William College with the original intention that it would serve as a training ground for future European administrators. He backdated the statute of foundation to 4 May 1800, to commemorate the first anniversary of his victory over Tipu Sultan at Seringapatam. Numerous books were translated from Sanskrit, Arabic, Persian, Bengali, Hindi, and Urdu into English at this institution.

== History ==
Wellesley's position on efficient administration was quite different from his predecessor, Lord Cornwallis, who insisted that an honest administration of British India by the company's servants could be ensured only by paying them adequate salaries. Wellesley, on the other hand, believed that an honest administration of British India by the company's servants could be ensured by adequate training and education, by combining efficiency with honesty.

Lord Wellesley initially intended this to be the "Oxford of the East", but his idea was scaled down to a school for Indian languages as a compromise over a long tussle with the Court of Directors of the East India Company led by Charles Grant, who had threatened to close the college, the creation of which it had not authorized.

== Languages ==
Fort William College aimed at training British officials in Indian languages and, in the process, fostered the development of languages such as Bengali and Urdu. Vernacular language study was prioritized with the intention of aiding colonial governance.

The period is of historical importance. In 1815, Ram Mohan Roy settled in Calcutta. It is considered by many historians to be the starting point of the Bengali Renaissance. Establishment of The Calcutta Madrassa in 1781, the Asiatic Society in 1784 and the Fort William College in 1800, completed the first phase of Kolkata's emergence as an intellectual centre.

The East India Company's administration needed Bengali printed works not only for the training of civil servants at the Fort William College, but also for codifying Company regulations and to provide a wider audience for British Orientalist scholars. William Carey established the first Bengali printing press as the Serampore Mission Press in 1800; with Carey's appointment as a teacher of Bengali in Fort William College that year, the Mission joined the efforts of the college in printing and publishing suitable textbooks in the vernacular. Between 1802 and 1852, books on diverse subjects-including history, legend, and moral tales- as well as a grammar and a dictionary were printed for Fort William College. Indigenous printing enterprises were not far behind: The first local entrepreneur was Babu Ram, who in 1807 set up his Sanskrit Press in Khidirpore to provide textbooks in Hindi and Sanskrit to Fort William.

Teaching of Asian languages dominated: Arabic, Urdu, Persian, Sanskrit, Bengali. Later, Marathi and even Chinese were added. Each department of the college was staffed by notable scholars. The Persian department was headed by Neil B. Edmonstone, Persian translator to the East India Company's government since 1794. While notable scholars were identified and appointed for different languages, there was no suitable person in Calcutta who could be appointed to teach Bengali. In those days, the Brahmin scholars learnt only Sanskrit, considered to be the language of the gods, and they did not study Bengali. The authorities decided to appoint Carey, who was with the Baptist Mission in Serampore. He, in turn, appointed Mrityunjoy Vidyalankar as head pandit, Ramnath Vachaspati as second pandit and Ramram Basu as one of the assistant pandits.

Along with teaching, translations were organized. The college employed more than one hundred local linguists. There were no textbooks available in Bengali. On 23 April 1789, the Calcutta Gazette published the request of several natives of Bengal for a Bengali grammar and dictionary.

== Location ==
The college was located at the corner of Council House Street and Dalhousie Square (now B. B. D. Bagh). After the college closed the building had a series of occupancies. First it was The Exchange of Messrs. Mackenzie Lyall & Co., then offices of the Bengal Nagpur Railway and later the local HSBC Bank office.

== Library ==
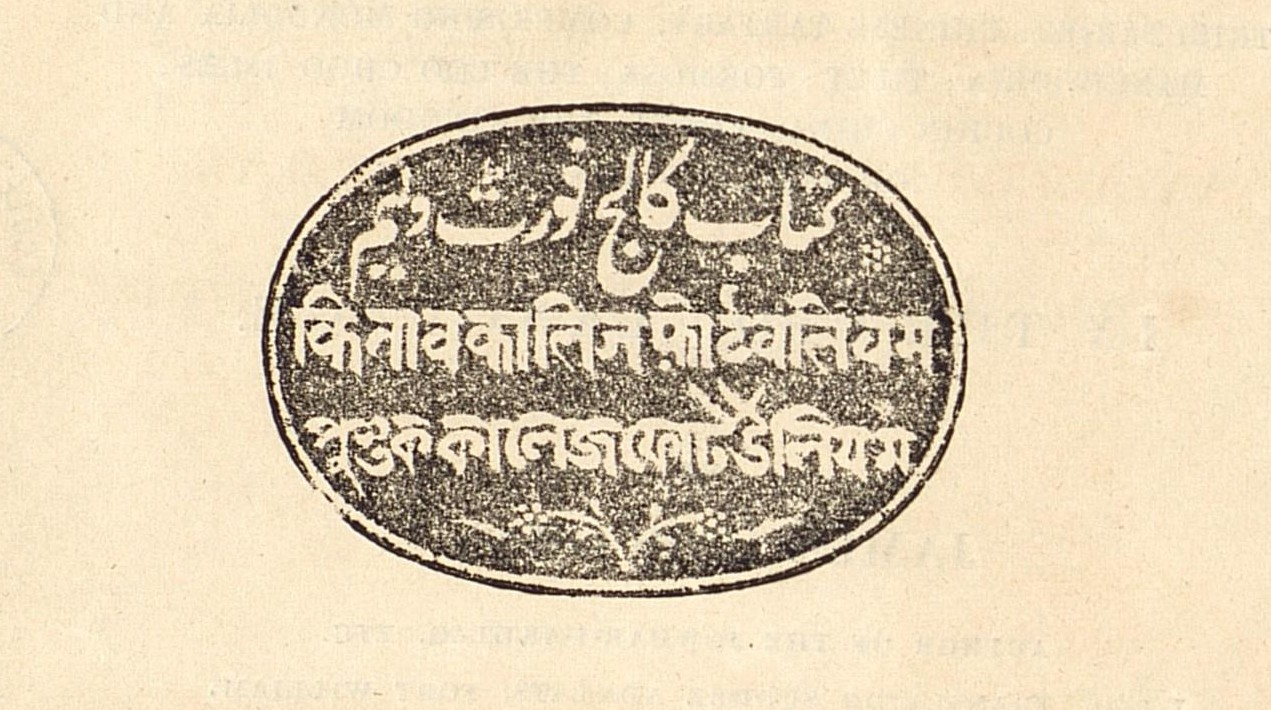
Ex libris from the Fort William College Library

The college library of Fort William was an important centre of learning and housed a magnificent collection of old manuscripts and many valuable historical books from across South Asia. Multiple MS copies were printed. When the college was dissolved in 1854, the books of the collection listed for preservation were transferred to the newly formed Calcutta Public Library, now the National Library. Some books were transferred to the School of Oriental Languages in Paris and are now held at BULAC.

== Hurdles ==
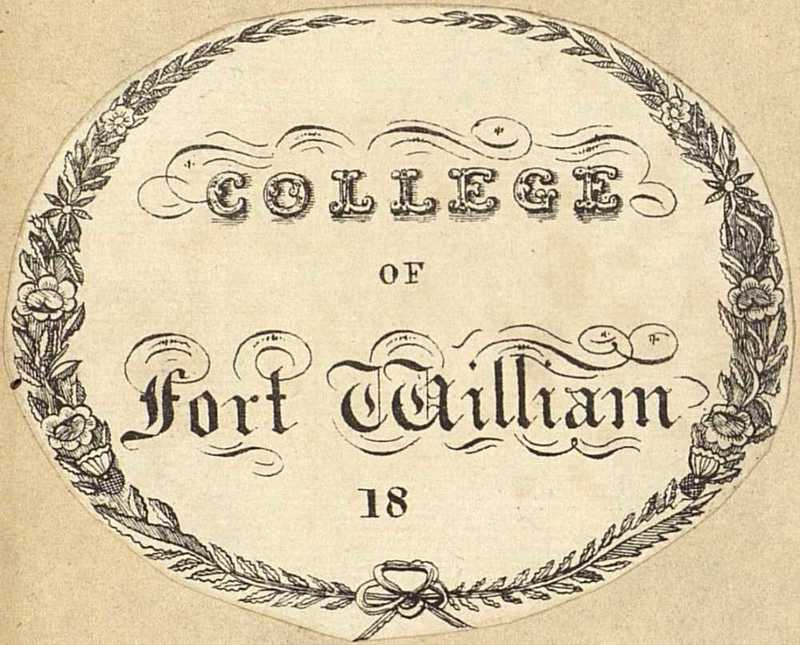
Ex-libris of the Fort William College Library

The Court of Directors of the British East India Company were never in favor of a training college in Calcutta, and for that reason, there was always a lack of funds for running the college. Subsequently, a separate college for the purpose, the East India Company College at Haileybury (England), was established in 1807. However, Fort William College continued to be a center of learning languages.

With the British settling down in the seat of power, their requirements changed. Lord William Bentinck announced his educational policy of public instruction in English in 1835, mostly to cater to the growing needs of administration and commerce. He clipped the wings of Fort William College, and the Dalhousie administration formally dissolved the institution in 1854.

== Eminent scholars ==
Fort William College was served by a number of eminent scholars. They contributed enormously towards development of Indian languages and literature. Some of them are noted below:

- William Carey (1761–1834) was with Fort William College from 1801 to 1831. During this period he published a Bengali grammar and dictionary, numerous textbooks, the Bible, grammar and dictionary in other Indian languages.
- Matthew Lumsden (1777–1835) was educated at King's College, Old Aberdeen. He went to India as assistant professor of Persian and Arabic in the College of Fort William, and in 1808, succeeded to the professorship.
- John Borthwick Gilchrist (June 1759 – 1841) was principally known for his study of the Hindustani language. He compiled and authored An English-Hindustani Dictionary, A Grammar of the Hindoostanee Language, and The Oriental Linguist.

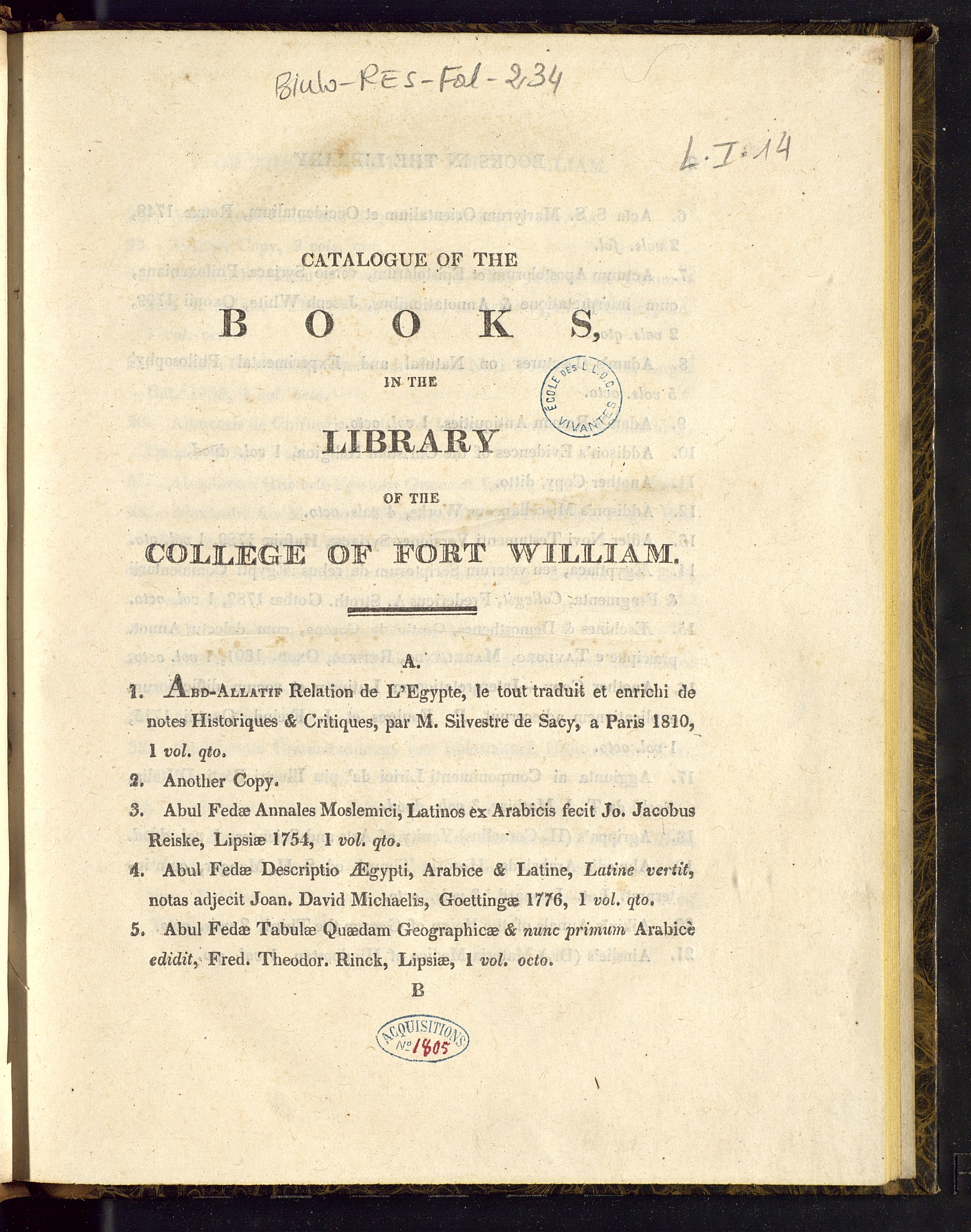
Catalogue of the books in the Library of the College of Fort William (Bibliothèque Numérique Aréale, BULAC)

- Mrityunjay Vidyalankar (c. 1762 – 1819) was the First Pandit at Fort William College. He wrote a number of textbooks and is considered the first 'conscious artist' of Bengali prose. Although a Sanskrit scholar he started writing Bengali as per the needs of Fort William College. He published Batris Singhasan (1802), Hitopodesh (1808) and Rajabali (1808). The last named book was the first published history of India. Mrityunjoy did not know English so the contents were possibly provided by other scholars of Fort William College.
- Tarini Charan Mitra (1772–1837), a scholar in English, Urdu, Hindi, Arabic and Persian, was with the Hindustani department of Fort William College. He had translated many stories into Bengali.
- Lallu Lal (also spelt as Lalloolal or Lallo Lal), the father of Sanskritized Hindustani prose, was instructor in Hindustani at Fort William College. In 1815, he printed and published the first book in the old Hindi literary language, Braj Bhasha, Tulsidas's Vinaypatrika.
- Ramram Basu (1757–1813) was with the Fort William College. He assisted William Carey, Joshua Marshman and William Ward in the publication of the first Bengali translation of the Bible.
- Ishwar Chandra Vidyasagar (1820–1891) was head pandit at Fort William College from 1841 to 1846. He concentrated on English and Hindi while serving in the college. After discharging his duties as academician, and engagements as a reformer he had little time for creative writing. Yet through the textbooks he produced, the pamphlets he wrote, and retelling of Kalidasa's Abhijñānaśākuntalam and Shakespeare's A Comedy of Errors, he set the norm of standard Bengali prose.
- Madan Mohan Tarkalankar (1817–1858)
