= Nicholson's Obelisk =

- نکلسن کی ابلیسک
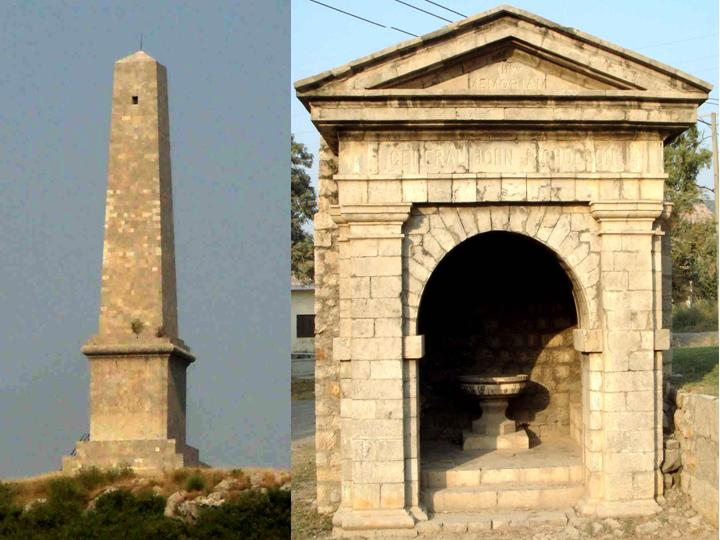
- Interactive map of Nicholson's Obelisk
- Location: Margalla Pass, Punjab, Pakistan
- Coordinates: 33°42′11″N 72°49′29″E
- Type: Obelisk
- Material: Granite
- Height: 40 feet (12 m)
- Completion date: 1886
- Dedicated to: John Nicholson

Nicholson's Obelisk, also known as Nicholson's Memorial, is an obelisk located in Rawalpindi District, Punjab, Pakistan, which was erected in 1868 in the honour of Brigadier-General John Nicholson. It is situated at the Margalla Pass of the Margalla Hills close to the twin cities of Rawalpindi–Islamabad, en route to the historical town of Taxila.

The granite obelisk, approximately 40 feet (12 m) tall, stands on a rocky prominence overlooking the Grand Trunk Road connecting Islamabad with Peshawar. There is also a small memorial fountain at the base of the hillock on which the Memorial/Obelisk stands.

== Background ==
Nicholson was born on 11 December 1822 in Lisburn, Ireland, the eldest son of Dr Alexander Jaffray Nicholson and Clara Hogg. He studied at the Royal School Dungannon, a public mixed school, in Dungannon, County Tyrone, Northern Ireland.

Nicholson joined the army of the British East India Company in 1839. Soon after arriving in India, he fought his first combat action in the First Anglo-Afghan War (1839–42). After the Anglo-Afghan War, he was appointed Political Officer in Kashmir and then District Commissioner in the Sangar area of Sindh.

He fought bravely during the First Anglo-Sikh War (1845–46), during which he was wounded in an attack on the Margalla Pass, where the Obelisk in his memory now stands. He distinguished himself again in the Second Anglo-Sikh War (1848–49).

John Nicholson became the Victorian "Hero of Delhi" and inspired several books, ballads and generations of young boys to join the army. He is referenced in numerous literary works, including Rudyard Kipling's Kim. Nicholson features in a number of novels about this period in history. He is mentioned by George MacDonald Fraser in his book Flashman in the Great Game. He also appears as one of the main characters in James Leasor's novel about the Indian Mutiny, Follow the Drum, describing his death in some detail. He is also featured in James Leasor's history of the siege, The Red Fort. A famous biography was also written about him by Lionel J Trotter (1897) and he comes in for conspicuous mention in the book Soldier-Sahibs:The Men who made the North-West Frontier (2001) by British author Charles Allen.

Nicholson also served as Deputy Commissioner of Bannu (Khyber Pakhtunkhwa, Pakistan) from 1852 to 1854. For his bravery and services towards British government, a tablet in a church at Bannu carries the following caption: “Gifted in mind and body, he was as brilliant in government as in arms. The snows of Ghazni attest his youthful fortitude; the songs of the Punjab his manly deeds; the peace of this frontier his strong rule. The enemies of his country know how terrible he was in battle, and we his friends have to recall how gentle, generous, and true he was.”

== See also ==
- Muhammad Hayat Khan

== Sources ==
- Edwardes, Michael (1969), Bound to Exile, Praeger, p. pp100
- Leasor, James (2011) [1956], The Red Fort, London: W. Lawrie, James Leasor Ltd, ISBN 978-1-9082-9142-4.
- Trotter, Lionel James (1897), The Life of John Nicholson: Soldier and Administrator, J. Murray, London
