= Attorney General Pollock =

Attorney General Pollock may refer to:

- Ernest Pollock, 1st Viscount Hanworth (1861–1936), Attorney General for England and Wales
- Sir Frederick Pollock, 1st Baronet (1783–1870), Attorney General for England and Wales
- Henry Pollock (1864–1953), Attorney General of Hong Kong and Attorney General of Fiji

== See also ==
- General Pollock (disambiguation)
