= John Coke (East India Company officer) =

Major-General Sir John Coke KCB JP DL (pronounced Cook; 17 November 1806 – 17 December 1897) of the 10th Regiment Bengal Native Infantry was a soldier of the East India Company Army, who raised in 1849 the 1st Regiment of Punjab Infantry, renamed in 1903 55th Coke's Rifles. Major-General Coke received the Delhi medal and clasp, and was made Knight Commander of the Order of the Bath. He was Justice of the Peace and Deputy Lieutenant for the county of Herefordshire, and was High Sheriff of Herefordshire for 1879.

== Early life and family ==
He was born 17 November 1806, the seventh (but fourth surviving) son of the Rev. Francis Coke the only surviving issue of the Rev. Richard Coke (1763–1831), and his wife, Anne Whitcombe.

A tradition in the Coke family of Trusley, Derbyshire, states that the founder of it was one Cook or Coke, who was employed in the service of Henry de Ferrars, Superintendent of William the Conqueror's horse armourers and farriers. They are said to have been located near Tutbury Castle, Staffordshire, in some unknown feudal capacity.

== Career ==
Coke received his commission as Ensign in the 10th Regiment Bengal Native Infantry 3 December 1827, and sailed for India three weeks later. He was promoted Lieutenant 29 August 1835, and that year appointed Adjutant of his regiment, which post he held for nine years. He also passed the Fort William College at Calcutta as interpreter in three languages.

In 1843, the 10th Regiment was sent to Sindh to reinforce Sir Charles James Napier. After about a year and a half in Sindh, the corps marched back to Hindustan.

== 2nd Anglo-Sikh War ==
Coke passed 1845–48 on furlough in Europe, thereby missing the First Anglo-Sikh War (1845–46), but returned to India in April 1848 following the outbreak of the Second Anglo-Sikh War, and Captain Coke joined the army of Sir Hugh Gough, Commander-in-Chief, India, at Ramnagar as a volunteer in 1849, doing duty with Colonel Tait's 2nd Irregular Cavalry. At the action of Chillianwalla his horse was shot when taking Major Dewes' Battery to the front. He was also present at the final victory of Goojerat, and at the pursuit of the Sikhs and Afghans to Peshawur under General Sir Sir Walter Gilbert.

== Raises the 1st Regiment Punjab Infantry ==
On the annexation of the Punjab by Lord Dalhousie in 1849, John Coke was appointed to raise a regiment for frontier service, and commenced raising the 1st Punjaub Infantry on 6 April 1849. On 23 February 1850, the regiment was reviewed by the Commander-in-Chief, Sir Charles Napier, who reported to Colonel Henry Montgomery Lawrence, Deputy Commissioner of Peshawar:

"As to Coke's regiment, I have seen nothing superior to it in drill – it is admirable; both you and I saw how this brave corps fought under its excellent leader in our five days' campaign in the Kohat Pass. I am more pleased with this young commander than I can express."

Coke also received thanks of the Honourable Court of Directors and the Governor of India for dispatch in raising the regiment and its services in the Kohat Pass. He received the thanks of the Governor-General in Council and the Punjab Board of Administration for the conduct of the regiment in the campaign under Sir Colin Campbell, in the Ranagie Valley, in May 1852.

== Appointed Deputy Commissioner of Kohat ==
In 1850, Coke was appointed Deputy Commissioner of Kohat, with civil and military charge of the district on the frontier of Afghanistan, then in a very critical state, the Hill Tribes making constant raids on the villages. Kohat at this time was the most lawless district in the Punjaub. During the five years it was under his charge it became distinguished for its loyalty and organised government. When Lord Napier of Magdala, as Commander-in-Chief in India, lately visited the district in his tour of inspection, he assured Major-General Coke that he was by no means forgotten by the inhabitants, whom he had endeavoured to rule to their own benefit and the advantage of the State.

In his History of the Indian Mutiny, Colonel George Bruce Malleson writes of

"Colonel Coke was one of the best known and most distinguished officers of the Punjaub Frontier Force. To a thorough knowledge of his profession he added an acquaintance with the natives of India not to be surpassed, and a rare power of bending them to his will. He had seen much service. He had been with Sir Charles Napier in Upper Sind, with Gough at Chilianwala and Gujrat, with Gilbert in pursuit of the Sikhs. After the conclusion of the second Sikh War, he served continuously, up to the outbreak of the Mutiny, on the frontier. There his name became a household word. Scarcely an expedition was undertaken against the wild border tribes but Coke bore a part in it. Twice was he wounded; but his unflinching demeanour, his power of leadership, whilst it gained the supreme confidence of his men, extorted respect and admiration from his enemies. Wherever he might, be his presence was a power."

He was first wounded in the Kohat Pass in 1853. In September 1855, he received the thanks of the Governor-General, Lord Dalhousie, for the conduct of his regiment at the capture of the intrenchments on the Summana Mountains, 5,000 feet high. The regiment commenced the ascent at ten o'clock on the night of 1 September, and did not get back until about the same hour on the 2nd, being twenty-four hours at work.

== Service in Indian Mutiny ==
In February 1857, he was, with his regiment, employed in the most successful campaign in the Bogdar Hills, when he was again wounded, and received the Frontier medal. In May of the same year, on the breaking out of the Indian Mutiny, he marched for Delhi. Colonel Malleson writes : —

" Summoned to Delhi early in August, Coke brought to the part assigned him in the siege all the qualities which had made his name on the frontier. He was always prominent in the fight, always daring and self-reliant. I may be pardoned if I relate here one special act, amongst many, which illustrated his conduct at this period. On 12 August Coke received instructions from Brigadier-General Showers to turn out the European picket at the Metcalfe stables, and taking the men composing it with him, to proceed through the Metcalfe gardens and attack the guns which had been firing on the picket the preceding day. No information was given him as to the locality of the guns, but having been quartered at Delhi before the outbreak, Coke imagined that he would find them in the vicinity of Ludlow Castle. He directed, then, the officer commanding the picket to extend the men on his right, and to follow the direction he should take. At the same time he ordered Lieutenant Lumsden, commanding his own regiment, to skirmish through the gardens on the left – the direction in which he expected to find the enemy in force. He then rode through the gardens towards Ludlow Castle. On reaching the boundary wall of the gardens, on the main road leading to the city, he found that an embrasure had been made in the wall of the garden. At the same moment he saw the enemy's guns – two nine-pounder brass guns – in the road, with horses attached, but no one with them, the enemy having apparently taken refuge in Ludlow Castle when driven out of the Metcalfe gardens by Lumsden. The horses' heads were turned towards' the city. An alarm – a stray bullet, a discharge close to them— might start them off at any moment. Quick as lightning the idea flashed into Coke's brain that if he could but turn the horses' heads towards the camp, it would little signify how soon the horses might be alarmed: they would of [sic] themselves capture the guns for the British. On the instant he alighted from his horse, got down through the embrasure into the road, ran to the horses of the leading gun, and turned them up the road towards cantonments. Whilst doing this he was shot in the thigh by the enemy in Ludlow Castle; but the guns were captured. He had done his self-allotted task, and reaped his only reward in the admiration of all who witnessed his splendid audacity.

He was in February 1858, given the command of a brigade to operate in Rohilkhand. On reaching Roorkee he had great difficulty in procuring transport. Malleson writes : —

"The country, in fact, had been so thoroughly exhausted that but little carriage was procurable. In this dilemma Coke's practical knowledge and fertility of resource came into play. He had read how, in the olden days of Indian warfare, the Brinjaris – dealers who carry their grain on pack cattle – had made themselves eminently serviceable. Calling to mind, then, that at the actual season these men were accustomed to pasture their cattle in the Terai, he sent thither, found them, and made such arrangements with their head men as enabled him to conquer a difficulty which many another man would have found insurmountable."

Lord Lawrence, writing to The Times in November 1878, on the Afghan war, named Major-General John Coke as one of the "models of frontier officers, good administrators, and able soldiers – men who devoted their health, and even their lives, to their duty."

== See also ==
- Punjab Irregular Force
- North-West Frontier

== Sources ==
- Coke, John Talbot (Major): Coke of Trusley in the County of Derby and Branches Therefrom, London, 1880. pp. 118–122
- Kelly's Handbook 1892
- List of Officers of the Bengal Army 1754–1834, vol.1, p. 359
