= Henry Taylor (cricketer, born 1875) =

Indian-born English sportsman

Personal information
- Full name: Henry Blair Johnson Taylor
- Born: 1 June 1875; Dalhousie, India, Punjab, British India
- Died: 29 May 1903 (aged 27); Bengeo, Hertfordshire, England
- Batting: Right-handed

Domestic team information
- Years: Team
- 1897: Cambridge University

Career statistics
Competition	First-class
Matches	2
Runs scored	3
Batting average	1.50
100s/50s	–/–
Top score	3
Catches/stumpings	1/–
- Source: Cricinfo, 4 July 2022

Henry Blair Johnson Taylor (1 June 1875 – 29 May 1903) was an Indian-born English sportsman who played both rugby union and first-class cricket for Cambridge University in the mid-1890s. He was born at Dalhousie in British India and died at Bengeo, Hertfordshire.

Taylor was the son of General Reynell Taylor and was educated at Newton College in Devon and at Jesus College, Cambridge. Arriving at Cambridge in 1894, he was picked and awarded a Blue for The Varsity Match rugby game against Oxford University in his first year, and again in 1896, appearing as a wing three-quarter back. His first-class cricket career as a right-handed middle-order batsman lasted just a week. It consisted of two matches for Cambridge University Cricket Club, both won by Cambridge by an innings, meaning he had just two first-class innings and made only three runs.

Taylor graduated from Cambridge University with a Bachelor of Arts degree in 1897. He became a schoolmaster, initially in Leamington, and then at Elstree School, but left in 1901 to join the Paget's Horse regiment for the Second Boer War. Invalided home, he resumed his educational career as a master at Bengeo school, but died from pneumonia a year later.
