= Holled Wallace Henry Coxe =

British soldier (1820–1898)

Major-General Holled Wallace Henry Coxe (16 October 1820 – 24 January 1898) was a British soldier and administrator of British India and a member of Henry Lawrence's "Young Men".

== Biography ==
Henry was born in Bangalore, part of the Madras Presidency in British India. His father was a chaplain with the East India Company but died whilst his wife was pregnant with Henry. He matriculated from Worcester College, Oxford in May 1839. His paternal uncle was Henry Octavius Coxe.

Henry entered the Bengal Army in June 1841 and first saw action in the Gwalior campaign of 1843 and was present at the Battle of Maharajpore. He became a Lieutenant in April 1850 and in June 1856 he was promoted to captain. As a Captain he was employed in the Expeditionary Force under Neville Bowles Chamberlain against the Mahsood Wuzleerees in 1860 and was present at the actions of Paloseen and Bunrah for which he had a medal with clasp. He was made a Major in June 1861 and Lieutenant Colonel in June 1867.

He retired in 1874, and the following January he was gazetted a Major General. He died on 24 January 1898 in Leatherhead, England at the age of 77 and was buried at the Church of St Mary & St Nicholas, Leatherhead.
