= James Lumsden =

James Lumsden may refer to:

- James Lumsden (military officer), Scottish soldier who served in the Swedish army
- James Lumsden (Lord Provost, died 1856) (1778–1856), Scottish stationer and Lord Provost of Glasgow
- James Lumsden (Lord Provost, died 1879) (1808–1879), Scottish stationer and Lord Provost of Glasgow
- Jimmy Lumsden (born 1947), Scottish footballer
