= Harry Burnett Lumsden =

British Indian Army general (1821–1896)

Sir Harry Burnett Lumsden KCSI CB
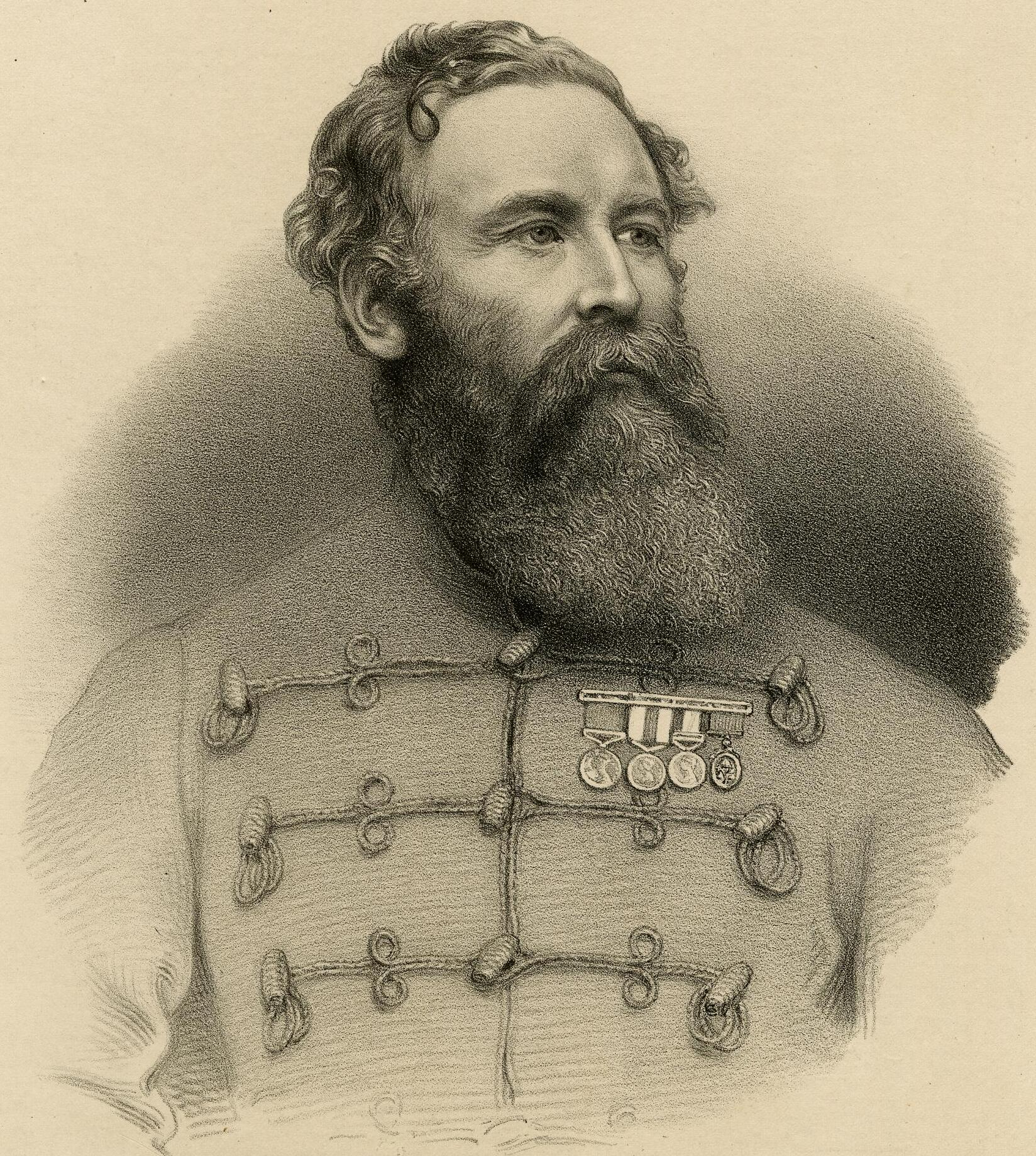
- Lithograph of Sir Harry Burnett Lumsden
- Born: 12 November 1821; On board the Rose, Bay of Bengal
- Died: 12 August 1896 (aged 74); Belhelvie, Scotland, United Kingdom
- Burial place: Belhelvie Kirkyard
- Spouse: Fanny Myers (m. 1866)
- Military career
- Allegiance: East India Company (British Raj) British India
- Branch: Bengal army
- Service years: 1841-1882
- Rank: Lieutenant-General
- Conflicts: First Anglo-Afghan War; First Anglo-Sikh War; Second Anglo-Sikh War; Indian Rebellion
- Awards: Knight Commander of the Order of the Star of India; Companion of the Order of the Bath

Lieutenant-General Sir Harry Burnett "Joe" Lumsden (12 November 1821 – 12 August 1896) was a British military officer active in the British Raj.

== Biography ==
=== Background ===
Lumsden was born aboard the East India Company's ship Rose in the Bay of Bengal. He spent the first six years of his life in Bengal, where his father Colonel Thomas Lumsden was serving as an Artillery officer. His father Thomas entered the Bengal Army in 1808 and served in the Anglo-Nepalese War, Third Anglo-Maratha War and First Anglo-Burmese War achieving distinction. His first cousin once removed was the orientalist Matthew Lumsden. He had six brothers, three of whom emigrated to Canada, whilst his younger brother Peter followed his path to India.

He was sent to Scotland at age six, where he was cared for by his grandmother in Aberdeenshire.

=== Early career ===
At the age of 16, he was nominated by John Shepherd, a fellow Aberdeenshire man and a Director of the East India Company for a direct cadetship in India. He travelled to India in 1838 commissioned into the 59th Bengal Native Infantry. During the First Anglo-Afghan War he was appointed as interpreter and quartermaster to the 33rd Bengal Native Infantry, marching to Peshawar with the army of George Pollock. He was present at the forcing of the Khyber Pass in 1842. During the war he would become close friends with two fellow officers who would also achieve distinction John Nicholson and Neville Bowles Chamberlain.

Following the war he returned to base in Ferozepur, having earned a campaign medal and six months extra pay. In early 1843, he rejoined the 59th Bengal Native Infantry stationed in Ludhiana, indulging in his passion for shikar with hunting expeditions throughout the Punjab. During this time he explored the region, learning near perfect Punjabi and growing accustomed to local customs and traditions.

=== The Punjab ===
During the First Anglo-Sikh War, Lumsden served as a commander of a company in his regiment. At the Battle of Sobraon he was part of the storming division on Hugh Gough's left flank. During the escape of the Sikh cavalry, Lumsden was shot in the foot which left him with a slight but permanent limp for the rest of his life.

At the conclusion of the war, Lumsden was hand-picked by Sir Henry Lawrence to become one of his assistants, a band of chosen men who would become known as Henry Lawrence's "Young Men". A number of these assistants had been brought to Lawrence's attention on the battlefield at Sobraon, including John Nicholson, William Hodson and Herbert Edwardes. Lawrence had been a friend of Thomas Lumsden, serving with him as an artillery officers earlier in his career. Lumsden later claimed that what first brought him to the attention of Lawrence was an incident a year or two previously, when he and a subaltern had been held prisoner by a gang of robbers following a shooting expedition on the banks of the Sutlej. A servant smuggled them a pencil and paper allowing them to call for help; help coming in the form of a cavalry led by Lawrence that same evening.

Lumsden's first posting was to Kangra in 1846, where he served out the summer. He was thereafter summoned to Lahore. Whilst in Lahore, he became privy to the politics of the Lahore Durbar, at the time dominated by the Maharani Jind Kaur and her lover Lal Singh. Noting how everyone of the Sirdars made no secret of their dislike for Lal Singh, he concluded that they were anxiously awaiting the time when the British would withdraw, and Lal Singh would consolidate power. In response to the political instability, like many fellow offers, but in contrast to his superior, Lawrence, Lumsden favoured the annexation of the Punjab.

The sale of Kashmir to Gulab Singh had created considerable unrest amongst Kashmiri locals. In late 1846, Lumsden accompanied an expedition led by Lawrence to dispose the incumbent governor Imam ud-Din, who had the backing of Lal Singh and support the new rule of Gulab Singh. On his return to Lahore, Lumsden was given a mission to command a force of Sikh infantry to reconnoitre the hills of Hazara. Despite initial concerns of leading men he had formerly seen as the enemy, and noting their fondness for opium, he would remark of his Sikh sepoys that "they were first rate men, ready for any work, always in the best of humours, fond of their officers, and just as obedient to orders as our own troops, and not giving one quarter the trouble as the latter do." Lumsden's mission was a success and he received the thanks of the government, and what he prized more, the approbation of Lawrence.

=== Corps of Guides ===
In 1847, Lumsden was nominated to raise a Corps of Guides, enthusiastically regarding it as the finest appointment in the country. Lawrence intended the corps as 'trustworthy men who could at a moment's notice act as guides to troops in the field, collect intelligence beyond as well as within the border.' At the same time he was to carry on his duties in the Punjab, and assist John Lawrence, brother of Henry, in Peshawar.

With his subaltern William Hodson, he pioneered the use of a drab-coloured uniform for field service that came to known as khaki. Lord Napier subsequently referred to the Guides as "the only properly dressed light troops in India". To enhance the regiment's prestige, Lumsden adopted selective recruitment, initially recruiting mainly from the local Pathan tribes of the Yusufzai, Khatak and Muhammadzai. So successful was the Corps that within months of its formation, there was a waiting list for enlistment. Lumsden would build up his force into what became the most famous unit of the British Indian Army, inspiring a degree of devotion bordering on idolatry.

In 1848, whilst Lawrence was on leave in Britain, Lumsden and his Guides were summoned to Lahore. They were tasked to unravel a conspiracy believed to have been organised by the Sikhs to sow discontent amongst certain members of the Bengal Native Infantry and Irregular Cavalry stationed in Lahore. Lumsden with the aid of Muhammad Pir Buksh succeeded in obtaining papers proving the conspiracy and linking it with Maharani Jind Kaur, who he was then charged with escorting from Sheikhupura to Ferozepur.

Later that year, the Second Anglo-Sikh War broke out. Lumsden was sent to support Herbert Edwardes in the Siege of Multan, where his Guides would go on to achieve considerable distinction. He would later assist General Hugh Wheeler in operations at the heights of Dullah and see action at the Battle of Gujrat. Following the war, he noted his disappointment that all of Lawrence's assistants, despite their achievements in service, were being overlooked for key political postings at the expense of more junior civilians. Nonetheless he was rewarded by Lawrence with a pay rise, the chance to remain in Peshawar and at the head of his beloved Guides, whose strength was now raised to four hundred horse and six hundred foot.

Lumsden initially based his regimental headquarters in a ruin outside of Peshawar, known as the Burj, which had been built in the seventeenth century by a wazir of the Mughal Empire. In 1851, Lumsden relocated the headquarters to Mardan and the Guides became part of the Punjab Irregular Force.

=== North West Frontier ===
In the years after the annexation of the Punjab, Lumsden was largely concerned with affairs of the border tribes. In 1849, he assisted in an expedition against the Baizai, who had been refusing to pay tribute to the British. The next year, he replaced John Lawrence as the political agent in Peshawar whilst Lawrence recuperated from fever in Shimla. Later that year he was part of a force moving against Afridi tribesmen who had attacked engineers building a road through the Kohat Pass killing twelve and wounding eight. Lumsden had favoured friendly relations with the hill tribes, especially the Afridis, as he feared military occupation would be prohibitively costly in terms of lives and treasure and his views were cordially endorsed by the new military commander in Peshawar, Sir Colin Campbell. Their views however gave way to the orders of the Governor-General, Lord Dalhousie, who demanded an iron handed response.

Throughout the summer of 1851, Mohmand tribesmen harassed the borders of British control. Lord Dalhousie advised that punishment should be as severe as was consistent with humanity, however such retaliation was opposed by both Lumsden and Campbell. They were able to convince Dalhousie to attempt measures of prevention rather than retaliation, however as the skirmishes continued, Dalhousie grew more incensed, and ordered military intervention. Campbell launched an expedition with Lumsden at his side, noting that "Lumsden's views, those of common sense, are the most prudent and best....Punish those of the leading men who have shown enmity or have done injury to those who are bound to protect but leave the cultivators of the soil upon the land unmolested". As operations became drawn out, criticism grew. On 5 January 1852, Dalhousie sacked Lumsden as Commissioner in Peshawar replacing him with Frederick Mackeson.

=== Later life ===
In 1852, Lumsden departed Peshawar and took leave in Britain after fifteen years continuous service in India. On 1 March 1853 he was promoted to captain and on 6 February 1854 was made a brevet Major for services in the last Sikh war. He returned to India in 1855 and resumed command of the Guides.

In 1857 he was sent on a mission to Kandahar with his younger brother Peter and Henry Bellew to assess the current military and political situation in Afghanistan. In May 1857, the Indian Mutiny broke out, causing Lumsden to fear for his safety six hundred miles from the nearest British post in Jacobabad and dependent entirely on the caprice of the Amir. Lumsden, relying on regular updates from Herbert Edwardes in Peshawar, requested permission to return to India, but his service in Afghanistan was deemed vital in the interests of the Empire by the Governor General. On 1 September 1857 he received news from his friend John Nicholson that his younger brother William had been killed in Delhi, whilst later that month he was informed Nicholson himself had been killed. On 15 May 1858, Lumsden was instructed to return to India. He was gazetted lieutenant-colonel and resumed life with the Guides. His services were recognised by John Lawrence who remarked of him:

"One of the ablest and best military officers in the service. He has distinguished himself in the Afghan war, both the Punjab wars, and in most of the border fights on the Peshawar frontier in the last ten years. He raised, organised and commanded the famous Guide corps. While he was absent at Kandahar, the corps performed excellent service before Delhi. Therefore, in undertaking the Candahar mission, Major Lumsden missed the opportunity of commanding his corps and of winning rank and distinction before Delhi; while on the other hand he gained little but honour and risk in the interior in Afghanistan".

In 1860 he served under his friend Neville Bowles Chamberlain in the Waziri Expedition. On 2 August 1860, whilst attending a regimental ball practice an assassin grabbed his sword and struck his arm. The assassin was subsequently apprehended by a Guide. In 1862, he was offered and accepted the command of the Nizam of Hyderabad's army in the Deccan. He pithily summarised his service in the Deccan saying, "found the Hyderabad Contingent in debt, and left it clear."

In 1866, whilst on leave in Britain he married Fanny Myers of Cumberland. He returned to India in November the same year, and resided in Rawalpindi with his wife. In 1869 his commission in Hyderabad expired and with no immediate prospects available in India, he resolved to return to England on leave. Before returning, he rested some months in the Deccan on account of his wife's health. In the spring of 1869, on the invitation of Lord Mayo he travelled to Ambala for the Durbar of Sher Ali Khan, affording him the chance to re-acquaint with old friends and comrades.

Lumsden left India with his wife on 12 April 1869, never to return. On the death of his father in 1874 he inherited the family estate in Belhelvie and made it their permanent home. He was made a Knight Commander of the Star of India in 1873 and retired in 1875 with the honorary rank of Lieutenant-General. He died on 12 August 1896 in Belhevlie following a short illness and was buried in the local church graveyard.

=== Legacy ===
His friend, Sir Richard Pollock remarked of him in later years:

""A singular mixture of shrewdness and simplicity, absolutely free from selfishness and self-seeking, with great originality, a perfect temper and a keen sense of humour...he disliked civil routine intensely which made him turn down offers of civil employment so affecting his advance".

== See also ==
- Henry Lawrence's "Young Men"
- Corps of Guides
