= Reynell Taylor =

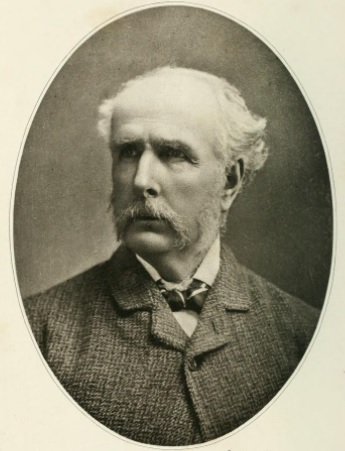
- Born: Reynell George Taylor; 25 January 1822; Brighton, West Sussex, United Kingdom
- Died: 28 February 1886 (aged 64); Newton Abbot, Devon, United Kingdom
- Relatives: Thomas Taylor (father)
- Military career
- Allegiance: East India Company (British Raj) British India
- Branch: Bengal Army
- Service years: 1840-1877
- Rank: Major-General
- Conflicts: Gwalior campaign First Anglo-Sikh War; Second Anglo-Sikh War; Indian Rebellion of 1857; Ambela Campaign
- Awards: Companion of the Order of the Bath; Companions of the Order of the Star of India

Major-General Reynell George Taylor CB CSI (25 January 1822 – 28 February 1886) was a British military officer who served in the Bengal Army.

== Early life ==
Taylor was born in Brighton on 25 January 1822, the youngest son of Major-General Thomas William Taylor CB of Ogwell, Devon, who served with the 10th Royal Hussars at the Battle of Waterloo. From Sandhurst, where his father was lieutenant-governor, he was commissioned as a cornet in the Indian cavalry on 26 February 1840.

== In India ==
Taylor first saw service with the 11th Bengal Light Cavalry in the Gwalior campaign of 1843, and at the close of the war was appointed to the bodyguard. In the First Anglo-Sikh War he was severely wounded in a cavalry charge in the Battle of Mudki on 18 December 1845. Sent to Lahore in 1847, he became one of that famous body of men who worked under Henry Lawrence, and subsequently John Lawrence, in the Punjab. That same year he was left in charge of the city of Peshawar, leader of ten thousand Sikh troops and the whole district. Taylor organised a column of four thousand men who departed from Peshawar to occupy the Bannu District, and safely led the men through the Kohat Pass in November–December 1847.

Taylor was in charge of Bannu at the outbreak of the Second Anglo-Sikh War. When he heard reports of the murders of Patrick Vans Agnew and W. A. Anderson at Multan on 20 April 1848, he dispatched troops to assist Herbert Edwardes and remained at his post. In July he was ordered to proceed to Multan, which was at that time under siege, and then set out in an unsuccessful attempt to rescue British captives then being held at Peshawar. He next gathered an irregular force of 1,021 foot, 650 horse, and three guns, and laid siege to the fort of Lukkee, the key to the Derajat, on 11 December 1848. The fort was captured on 11 January 1849. For his services he was promoted captain on 15 December 1851 and major the next day.

In 1855, after a prolonged visit to England, he was appointed commandant of the Corps of Guides. During the Indian Mutiny he was in charge of the Kangra district, and in 1859 he was appointed commissioner of the Derajat. He was promoted lieutenant-colonel on 21 December 1859, and in 1860 was chief political officer of the Waziri expedition. Before retiring from the Derajat, in order to become commissioner of Peshawar in the spring of 1862, he paid for the Church Missionary Society to establish a station in the district. The first head of the mission was Valpy French. In 1863 he served throughout the Ambela Campaign, was promoted to colonel on 3 April 1863, and received the Order of the Bath the following month. He was granted the Order of the Star of India in June 1866. After a short visit to England in 1865 he returned for the last time to India, to serve as commissioner of the Ambala district From 1870 he held the same post in the Amritsar division.

== Last years ==
Taylor retired in 1877 as major-general. He was promoted lieutenant-general that year, and general on 15 December 1880. He died at Newton Abbot on 28 February 1886. A biography by Ernest Gambier-Parry was published in 1888.

== Family ==
On 11 December 1854 Taylor married Ann, daughter of Arthur Holdsworth of Widdicombe, Devon. She survived him, along with several children, including Millicent Mary, who founded the Society of the Precious Blood, an Anglican religious order, and Henry, who played both first-class cricket and rugby union for Cambridge University.
