= Rachel Lumsden (artist) =

British artist (born 1968)

Rachel Lumsden (born 10 March 1968) is a British and Swiss artist based in Switzerland.

== Early life and education ==
Lumsden was born in Newcastle upon Tyne on 10 March 1968. She gained a Bachelor of Fine Art degree at Nottingham Trent University (1991) and a Master in Postgraduate Studies in painting at the Royal Academy Schools (1998). She moved to Switzerland in 2002, and has dual Swiss and British nationality.

== Selected publications ==
- Lumsden, Rachel (2023). Igniting Penguins: a Manifesto for Painting. Zürich: Scheidegger & Spiess. ISBN 9783039421466.
