= Matthew Lumsden =

Scottish orientalist

Matthew Lumsden (1777–1835) was a Scottish orientalist. He was educated at King's College, Aberdeen, Scotland, and held a professorship of Persian and Arabic at the College of Fort William, India.

== Biography ==
He was fifth son of John Lumsden of Cushnie, Aberdeenshire. After being educated at King's College, Old Aberdeen, he went to India as assistant professor of Persian and Arabic in the college of Fort William, and in 1808 succeeded to the professorship. In 1812 he was appointed secretary to the Calcutta Madrasa, and superintended translations of English works into Persian then in progress. From 1814 until 1817 he had charge of the company's press at Calcutta, and in 1818 he became secretary to the stationery committee.

In bad health, Lumsden left India on furlough in March 1820, and travelled with his cousin, Lieutenant Thomas Lumsden (father of General Harry Burnett Lumsden), through Persia, Georgia, and Russia to England. An account of this journey was published by Lieutenant Lumsden in 1822.

Lumsden returned to India in 1821. He died at Tooting Common, Surrey, on 31 March 1835. From King's College, Old Aberdeen, to which he presented his own and many other oriental works, he received in 1808 the degree of LL.D.

== Works ==
Lumsden published:

- A Grammar of the Persian Language, 2 vols. Calcutta, 1810.
- A Grammar of the Arabic Language, in 2 vols., Calcutta, 1813, of which only the first volume appeared.
- A Letter to Lieutenant Gavin Young … in Refutation of his Opinions on some Questions of General Grammar, Calcutta, 1817.

He also edited Firdausī's Shah Namu, Calcutta, 1811, with a revised text and an English preface.
