= Bibliothèque universitaire des langues et civilisations =

Bulac
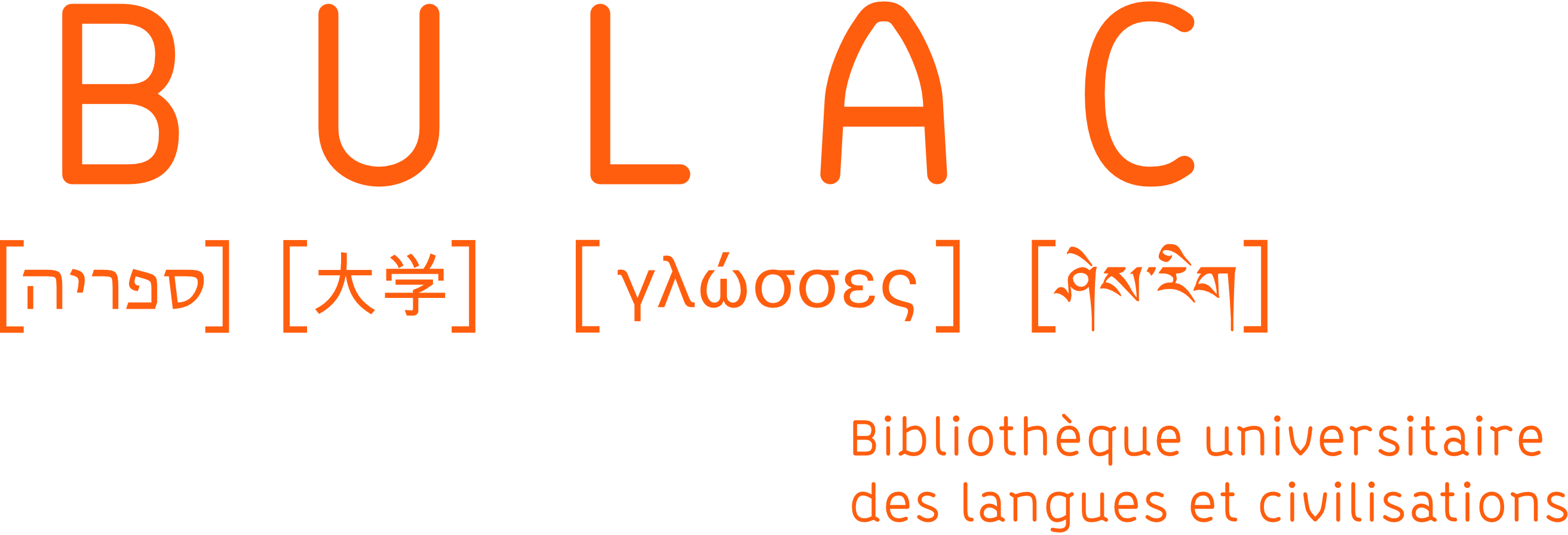

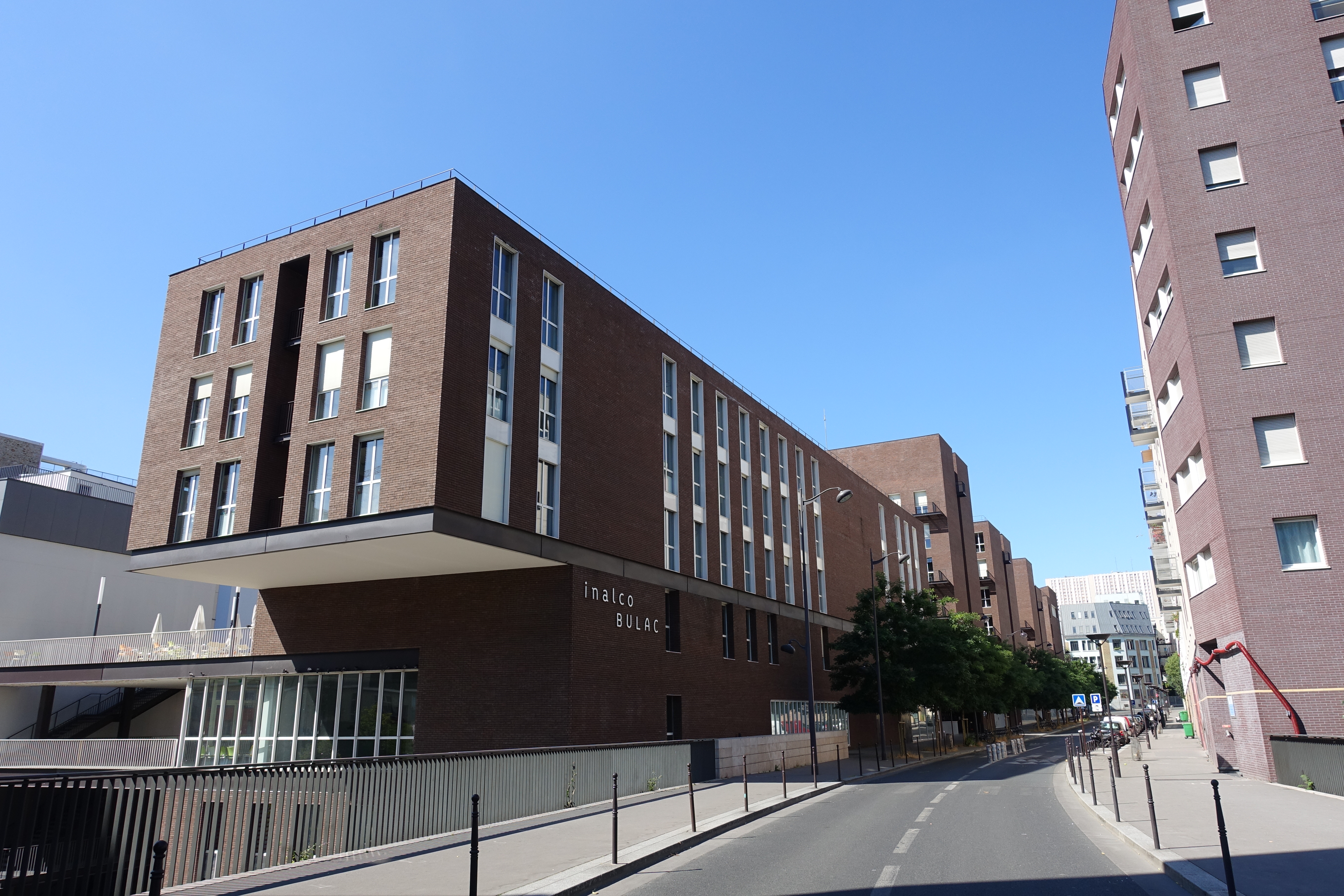
- 48°49′37.8″N 2°22′32.5″E
- Location: 13th arrondissement of Paris, France
- Established: December 12, 2011
- Architect: Yves Lion

Collection
- Items collected: 1,500,000
- Size: 1,500,000 title

Access and use
- Members: 27,000 in 2019

Other information
- Budget: €5,000,000
- Director: Marie-Lise Tsagouria
- Employees: 111 in 2019
- Website: www.bulac.fr

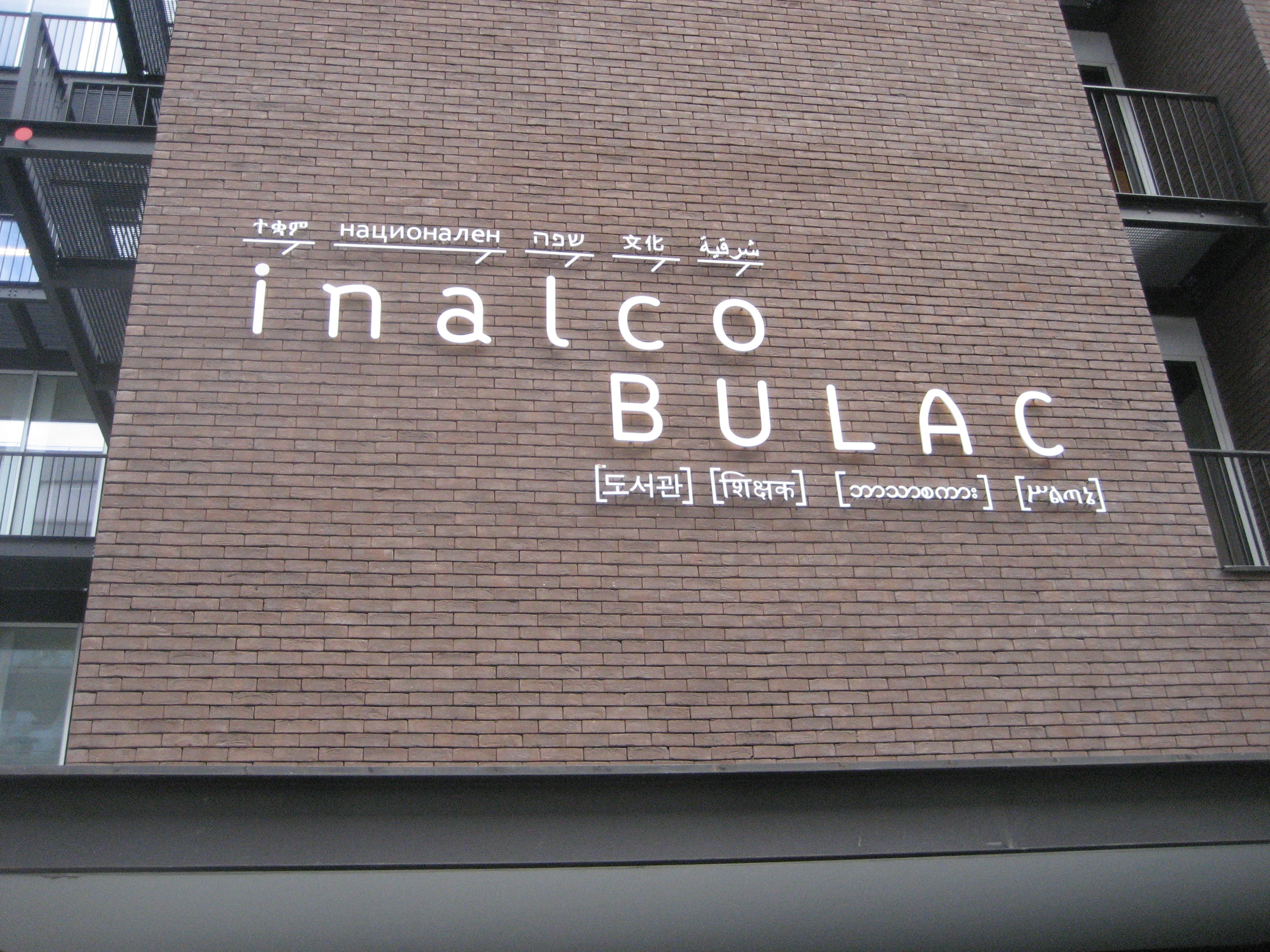
BULAC sign

The Bibliothèque universitaire des langues et civilisations (BULAC) is a major academic library located in Paris Rive Gauche and which has been open to the public since its 2011 opening. The library has a scope that includes all languages and civilisations that are not those of the Western World. It provides more than one million documents written in all languages, formed from the former collections of more than 20 libraries.

== Building ==
The construction of the building began in summer 2008. The architect is Yves Lion. The library has five floors within the building, the public space is on three floors with 910 seats.

The building is under the responsibility of the region Île-de-France which also provided two-thirds of the financing, the French State provided the rest. The financing was about 80 million euros.

The operating cost is about 2.5 million euros per year.

== Status ==
The BULAC is legally a groupement d'intérêt public made of the following institutions:

- The French State (ministère de l'Enseignement supérieur et de la Recherche);
- Institut national des langues et civilisations orientales (Inalco);
- École pratique des hautes études (EPHE);
- School for Advanced Studies in the Social Sciences (in French: École des hautes études en sciences sociales, or EHESS);
- École française d'Extrême-Orient;
- Pantheon-Sorbonne University;
- University of Paris III: Sorbonne Nouvelle;
- Paris-Sorbonne University (which became Sorbonne Université in 2018);
- Paris Diderot University (which became Université Paris-Cité in 2022);
- centre national de la recherche scientifique (CNRS).

The BULAC is administrated by a general assembly where the ministry has four representatives (two interested in higher education, two interested in research). The other preceding institutions have one representative each. A scientific council or conseil scientifique made of French and foreign professors and researchers defines the general Collection Management Policy.

Direction

BULAC direction is made of a director, a vice-director and a scientific director.

- Director: Marie-Lise Tsagouria
- Vice-director: Jean-François Chanal
- Scientific director: Benjamin Guichard who took over from Francis Richard in 2015

== Collections ==
The collections of the library include 1.5 million volumes which cover 350 languages in 80 alphabets.

=== Libraries incorporated ===
BULAC gathers the former collections of about twenty different libraries of specific interest. The main of these libraries is the Bibliothèque interuniversitaire des langues orientales (formerly the bibliothèque de l'École des langues orientales), which was located until 2011 on four different sites, including Inalco.

The other libraries incorporated into the BULAC are:

- the Slavic collection of the Bibliothèque inter-universitaire de la Sorbonne
- from the université Paris III:
  - the bibliothèque James-Darmesteter of the Institut d'études iraniennes
  - the bibliothèque Jules-Bloch
  - the Finnish and Turkish Ottoman collections of the Common service of documentation (in French: Service commun de documentation, or SCD) of Paris III
- part of the collections of the library of the Centre d'études slaves (Sorbonne Université)
- part of the collections of the UFR Langues et civilisations de l'Asie orientale (Université Paris Cité)
- part of the collections of the library of the École française d'Extrême-Orient
- part of the collections of the six libraries of the École des hautes études en sciences sociales (EHESS):
  - library of the Centre de recherches sur le Japon
  - library of the Centre d’études sur la Chine moderne et contemporaine
  - library of the Centre d’études sur l’Inde et l’Asie du Sud
  - library of the Centre de recherches sur la Corée
  - library of the Centre d´études africaines
  - library of the Centre d´étude des mondes russe, caucasien et centre-européen
- the indianist collections of the central library of the history and philology section of the École pratique des hautes études (EPHE)

=== Documents ===
Special attention was put on open access collections, which include 225 000 documents (books and journals), in French, in English, and above all in the non-Western languages which are the core interest of the library.

=== Library catalogue ===
The catalogue of the BULAC, performed with Koha, inventories all the books of the library, excepting part of the books written in non-Latin characters which were obtained before 2000. The documents in languages of non-Latin writing may be described:

- in original characters, following the written form of the language and the meaning of the writing.
- in transliteration or transcription of the non-Latin writings: each Arabic, Chinese, Greek, Thai character,... is transcribed by a Latin character (transliteration), or by its phonetic transposition (transcription).

In 2019, the catalogue was enhanced with a discovery system (EBSCO Discovery System) to allow access to online resources (articles, journals and e-books, etc.) and to digitized heritage collections through a same research field.

=== The BiNA : Digitized heritage collections ===
The BiNA (Bibliothèque Numérique Aréale or Regional Digital Library), performed with Omeka, gives access to all the copyright-free documents digitized by the library: heritage collections from all over the world selected among the most valuable ones of the library (old prints, manuscripts, etchings, journals...). All of these documents are accessible and downloadable on the BiNA website.

The digitized documents are divided up into ten collections, according to their geographical origin and/or their language:

- Asia
- Turkish area
- Middle East, the Maghreb, Central Asia
- Persian area
- Arabic area
- Naxi manuscripts
- Chinese area
- Turkish Ottoman manuscripts
- Persian manuscripts
- Arabic manuscripts

=== Le Carreau de la BULAC ===
BULAC librarians also created and lead, since 2013, Le Carreau de la BULAC, a research blog on the Hypothèses.org platform. This blog offers to students and scholars interested in languages and non-Western civilizations news and informations on the collections of the library and on area studies.

=== La Croisée de la BULAC ===
In addition, La Croisée de la BULAC inventories the last publications from a selection of research blogs with interest on Africa, Asia, Central and Eastern Europe, Middle East and the Muslim world, as well as on indigenous cultures of the Pacifics and America.

== See also ==
- List of libraries in France
