= Frederick Richard Pollock =

British Indian Army and Indian Political Service officer

Major-General Sir Frederick Richard Pollock KCSI (12 January 1827 – 24 December 1899) was a British Indian Army and Indian Political Service officer and one of Henry Lawrence's "Young Men".

Pollock was born in London, the sixth son of Sir Frederick Pollock, Bt. He was commissioned into the Bengal Army of the East India Company and served under Sir Henry Montgomery Lawrence in the Punjab commission. He served as Assistant Commissioner of Kohat District from October 1849 to May 1851. In 1866 he was appointed Deputy Commissioner of Peshawar. He was granted the rank of Major General on 31 May 1879. He married Adriana Nicolas in 1856, and had three sons and two daughters. He died in London in 1899 at the age of 72.
