= Vans Agnew Monument =

Historical monument in Punjab state of Pakistan

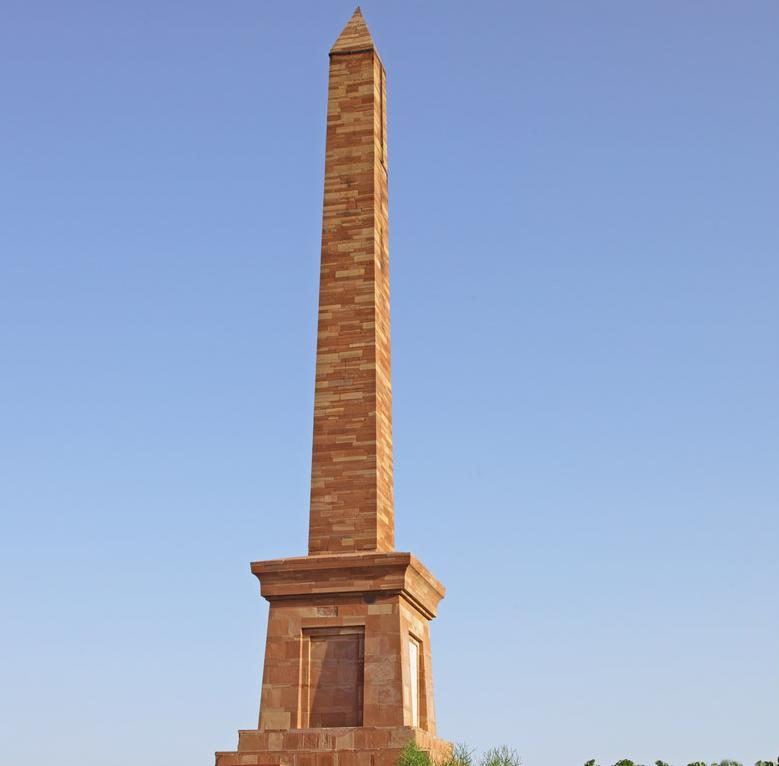
- Interactive map of Vans Agnew Monument
- Location: Multan, Punjab, Pakistan
- Coordinates: 30°11′55″N 71°28′29″E
- Designer: British East India Company
- Type: Monument
- Dedicated to: Patrick Alexander Vans Agnew; William A. Anderson

Vans Agnew Monument, also known as the Vans Agnew Memorial, is a monument in Multan, Punjab, Pakistan.

== History ==
Vans Agnew Monument was commissioned by the British East India Company. It commemorates murder of Patrick Alexander Vans Agnew (1822–1848) and Lieutenant William A. Anderson of the 1st. Bombay Fusilier Regiment by followers of Dewan Mulraj, the Diwan of Multan. This instigated the Second Anglo-Sikh War, which culminated in the British East India Company's conquest and annexation of the Punjab.

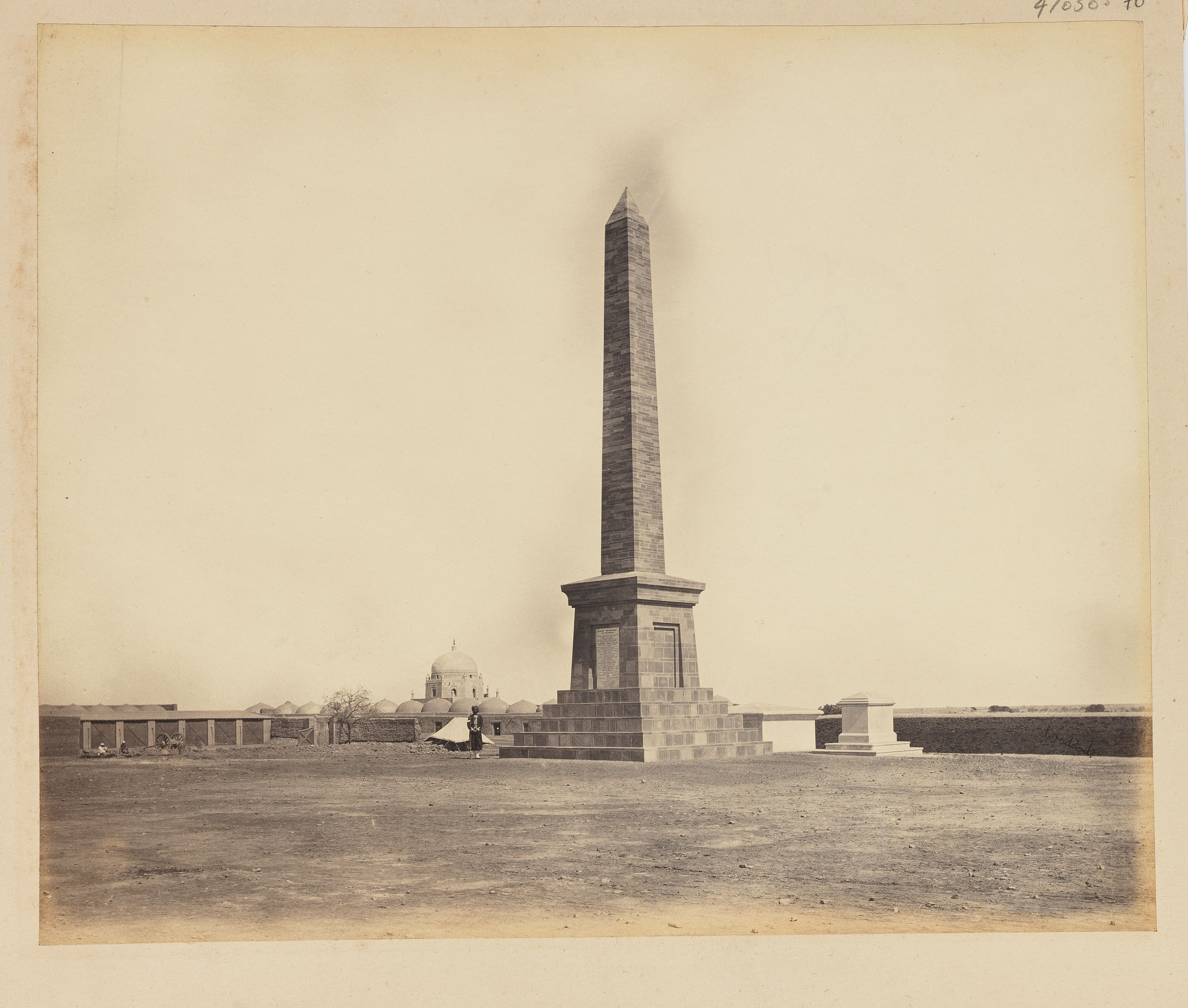
Photograph of the Vans Agnew Monument, Multan, Punjab, ca.1880. A Sikh soldier is standing near it.

The monument stands over the final resting place of Vans Agnew, a member of the Bengal civil service, and Lieutenant Anderson of the 1st Bombay Fusilier Regiment. The pair were dispatched, as Assistants to the Resident at Lahore Sir Henry Lawrence, to relieve Dewan Moolraj, Viceroy of Multan, of his fortress and duties at his behest. However, they were assaulted and injured by the garrison on April 19, 1848, and subsequently abandoned by their Sikh escort. On the following day, they were brutally murdered at the Eedgah, under the walls of Multan.
