= Siege of Multan (1848–1849) =

Part of the Second Anglo-Sikh War

- Part of the Second Anglo-Sikh War
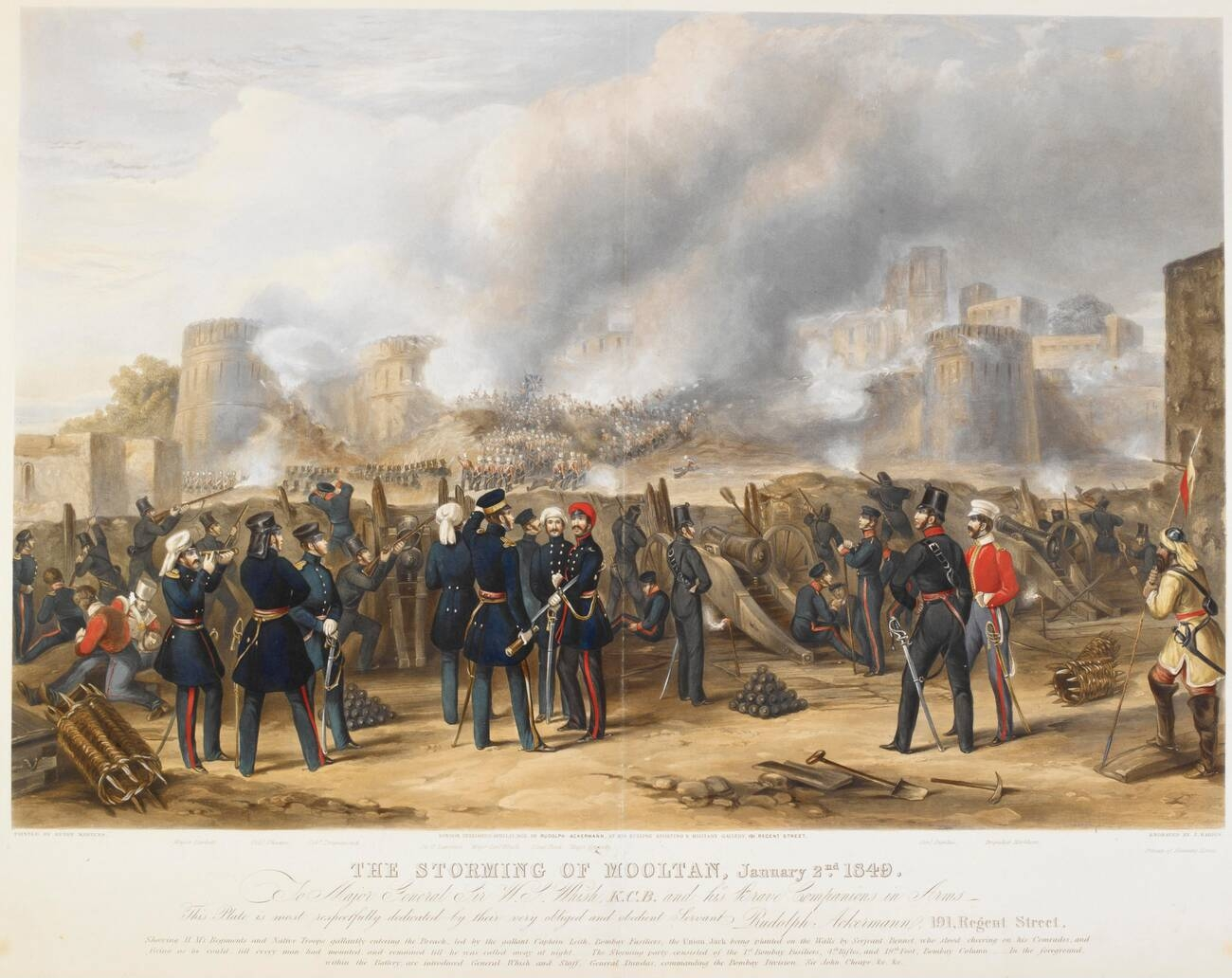
- The Storming of Mooltan, 2nd Jan 1849
Date	19 April 1848 – 22 January 1849
Location	Multan, Punjab 30°12′00″N 71°25′00″E
Result	British victory

Belligerents
East India Company	Sikh Empire

Commanders and leaders
Gen. Whish	Diwan Chopra

Strength
32,000 troops 150 guns	12,000 troops 66 guns

Casualties and losses
5,000	2,500
- Location of Multan within present-day Pakistan

The siege of Multan began on 19 April 1848 and lasted until 22 January 1849, and saw fighting around Multan (in present-day Punjab, Pakistan) between the British East India Company and the Sikh Empire. It began with a rebellion against a ruler imposed by the East India Company, which precipitated the Second Anglo-Sikh War, and ended when the last defenders of the city surrendered to British forces.

== Background ==
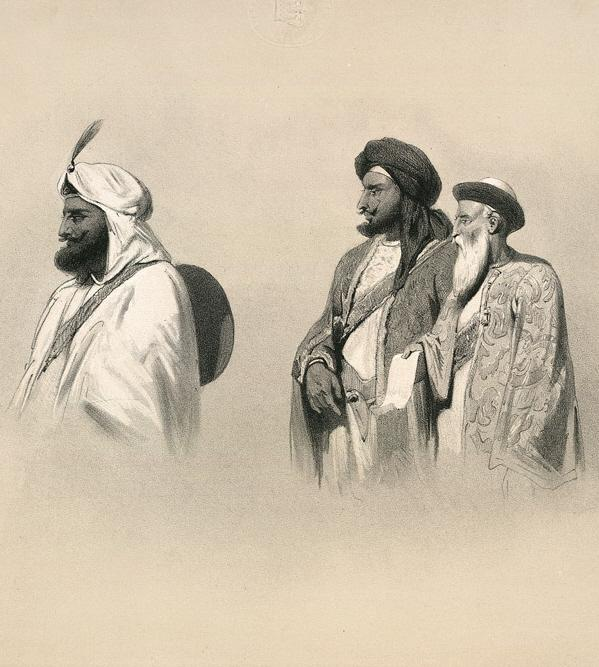
Sheikh Imam-ud-din, governor of Kashmir under the Sikh Empire, fought on the side of the British during the siege of Multan. Pictured along with Ranjur Singh and Diwan Dina Nath, c. 1847

Multan had been captured and incorporated into the Sikh Empire of Ranjit Singh in 1818. In 1845, although the population was almost half Muslim, it was ruled by a Hindu vassal, Dewan Mulraj. In that year, the First Anglo-Sikh War broke out, and was won by the British East India Company. There was an uneasy peace for three years, during which Mulraj attempted to maintain practical independence while being nominally subject to the East India Company.

In 1848, Multan had a population of 80,000. It was the centre of trade for a wide region, and was renowned for its wealth. There were large stores of spices, silks and valuables. Early in 1848, the newly appointed Commissioner in the Punjab, Sir Frederick Currie, demanded that Mulraj pay duties and taxes previously paid to the central Durbar of the Sikh Empire and now in arrears. Mulraj attempted to forestall a complete annexation of Multan by abdicating in favour of his son. Currie nevertheless decided to impose a compliant Sikh ruler, Sardar Khan Singh, who was to be accompanied by a British Political Agent, Patrick Vans Agnew.

== The revolt in Multan ==
On 18 April, Vans Agnew and another officer, Lieutenant Anderson from the East India Company's Bombay Army, arrived outside Multan with a small escort of Gurkhas. The next day, Mulraj conducted Khan Singh and the two British officers to the citadel and handed over the keys, with no sign of hostility. As the two officers began to ride out of the citadel, a soldier from Mulraj's army attacked Vans Agnew. This may have been the sign for a concerted attack, as a mob surrounded and attacked them. Mulraj's troops either stood by, or joined the mob. Both officers were wounded, and they and Khan Singh retired to a Mosque outside the city, where Anderson wrote a plea for help. A despatch rider carried it to Currie in Lahore, while a second took a copy via a different route, across the Indus River.

During the night, most of Vans Agnew's escort left. Next morning, the mob pushed Khan Singh aside and hacked the two British officers to death.

Mulraj had probably not been a party to the conspiracy among his own troops. He nevertheless regarded himself as committed to rebellion by their actions. He presented Vans Agnew's head to Khan Singh and told him to take it back to Currie.

== The Battle of Kineyri ==
The British Political Agent in Bannu, Lieutenant Herbert Edwardes, took the first steps to suppress Mulraj's revolt. He intercepted the second copy of Vans Agnew's letter to Currie, and immediately began to concentrate troops. He, and other junior British officers were to be frustrated by Currie in Lahore, who proposed to do nothing during the Hot Weather and Monsoon seasons. This was partly for reasons of economy and lack of preparation, but he was supported by the Governor General of India, Lord Dalhousie and the Commander-in-Chief of the Bengal Army, Sir Hugh Gough, who did not wish to expose European troops to a campaign during the harsh weather.

Meanwhile, Mulraj was reinforced by several other regiments of the Khalsa, the army of the Sikh empire, which rebelled or deserted. He also took other measures to strengthen his defences, digging up guns which had previously been buried and enlisting more troops.

In early June, Edwardes began to lead an army against Multan. On 18 June, his leading troops (Pashtun irregulars) crossed the Chenab River on a ferry boat. They were engaged by Mulraj's artillery and forced to take cover for several hours. Mulraj's infantry and cavalry began to advance but Edwardes was reinforced by two regiments of the Khalsa under Colonel Van Cortlandt, an Anglo-Indian soldier of fortune. Van Cortlandt's artillery caused heavy losses among the Multani troops and Edwardes's Pashtuns counter-attacked. Mulraj's forces retreated to Multan, having suffered 500 casualties and lost six guns.

== Sher Singh's defection ==
Once Currie learned of this victory, he at last ordered a comparatively small force from the East India Company's Bengal Army under General William Whish to begin the siege of Multan. As it was too small to encircle the city, Currie decided to reinforce them and Edwardes with a substantial detachment of the Khalsa under Sher Singh Attariwalla. The appointment of Sher Singh alarmed many junior Political Agents, as his father, Chattar Singh Attariwalla, was apparently openly preparing to revolt in Hazara to the north of the Punjab. Despite warnings, Currie nevertheless ordered a detachment from Chattar Singh's army under his second in command, Jundial Singh, to reinforce Sher Singh. This allowed Jundial Singh and other officers to influence Sher Singh and spread disaffection among his regiments.

At this stage the besiegers consisted of Whish's division (8,089 men, 32 siege guns, 12 horse artillery guns), Edwardes's irregulars (4,033 cavalry and 7,718 infantry), a contingent from the Muslim state of Bahawalpur (1,900 cavalry and 5,700 infantry) and Sher Singh's force (3,382 cavalry and 909 infantry).

On 14 September, Sher Singh openly rebelled against the East India Company. This left the East India Company's forces too weak to maintain the siege, and they were forced to retreat. Most of Edwardes's troops and the Bahawalpur troops dispersed to their homes. Sher Singh and Mulraj nevertheless were not prepared to cooperate. At a meeting at a neutral mosque outside the city, it was agreed that Sher Singh would move north into the mainly Sikh-populated areas of the Punjab.

== The siege ==
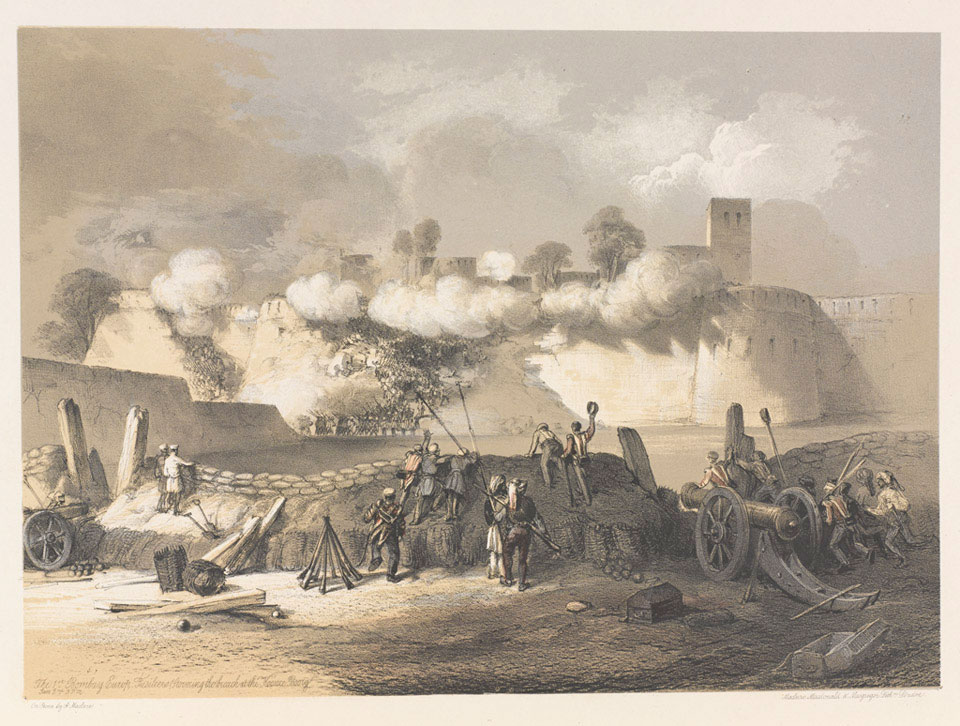
The 1st Bombay European Fusiliers storming the Breach at the Koonee Boorg, 1849.

Sikh arms and colors used during the siege

Late in November, Whish was reinforced by a substantial force from the East India Company's Bombay Army. Some observers claimed that the sepoys of the Bombay contingent, being of generally lower caste than those of the Bengal Army, were more willing and skilled at comparatively menial tasks such as digging trenches. Whish's combined force amounted to 32,000, of which 15,000 were from the British Army or European (mainly Irish) troops of the Bengal and Bombay armies. He also had 150 pieces of artillery, many of which were heavy guns or mortars. It was comparatively easy to supply this large force, as Multan lay near the Indus River, and steamships could bring supplies some way up the river and to within a short distance of the city.

Inside the city, Mulraj commanded 12,000 troops, with 54 guns and 12 mortars. (Some sources state that 80 guns were mounted in the citadel, though some of these may have been obsolete or decorative pieces).

On 27 December, Whish ordered four columns of troops to attack the suburbs. Mulraj's forces were driven back into the city, and Whish's force set up batteries 500 yards from the city walls. Under cover of their fire, breaching batteries were set up only 80 yards from the walls, and created two breaches in them while causing great damage in the city. On 30 December, the main magazine in the citadel exploded, killing 800 of the defenders. It was a mosque in which 180 tonnes of gunpowder were stored. A British mortar shell hit it. It is considered one of the largest non-nuclear explosions in history. Mulraj nevertheless maintained his fire and sent a defiant message to Whish, stating that he still had enough powder to last a year. He attempted to mount a sortie against the besiegers on 31 December but this was driven back.

Whish ordered a general assault on 2 January 1849. The attackers successfully scaled the breaches, and the battle became a bloody house-to-house fight in the city, in which many defenders and civilians were killed indiscriminately. Whish ordered the civilians to be herded into the main square; he may have intended to spare them from further fighting but the action of corralling them was also accompanied by further casualties.

With the fall of the city, only the already-scarred citadel remained, but it held out for another fortnight against heavy bombardment. On 18 January, Whish's sappers exploded three mines under its walls, causing heavy losses and destroying large sections of its walls. Mulraj offered to surrender if his life was spared, but Whish insisted on unconditional surrender, and on 22 January, Mulraj gave himself up, with 550 men.

== Aftermath ==
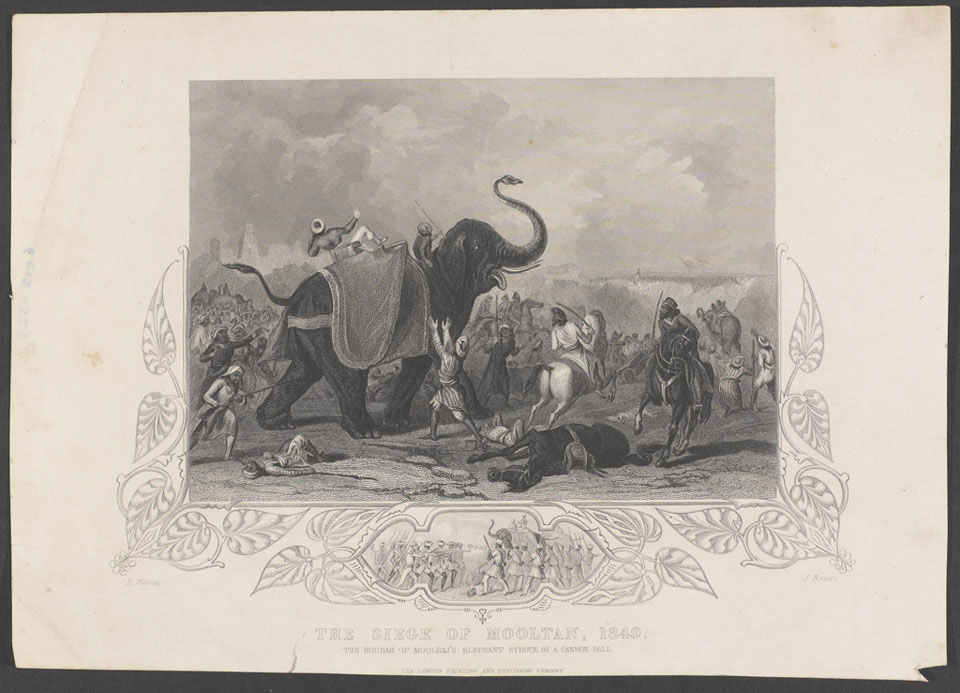
'The Siege of Mooltan', 1849. Moolraj's elephant struck with a cannonball.

Corporal John Ryder of the (European) Bombay Fusiliers later wrote of the city after the siege,

Mountains of dead lay in every part of the town, and heaps of human ashes in every square, where the bodies had been burnt as they were killed. Some were only half-consumed. Many had been gnawed and pulled to pieces by dogs; and arms, legs, heads and other parts lay in every place. The town swarmed with millions of flies.

The British gained vast quantities of loot. Mulraj's treasury was worth three million pounds, a huge sum for the time. There was also much looting in the town, by both British and Indian soldiers. With the fall of Multan, Whish's army was able to reinforce the main Bengal Army force under Sir Hugh Gough. Whish's heavy guns were decisive at the Battle of Gujrat, which effectively broke Sher Singh's and Chattar Singh's armies and ended the war.

Mulraj was placed on trial for the murders of Vans Agnew and Anderson. He was cleared of premeditated murder, but was found guilty of being an accessory after the fact, in that he had rewarded the murderers and openly used the deaths as pretext for rebellion. (Under British law at the time, an "accessory after the fact" of a crime was liable to the same punishment as the criminal.) Mulraj was sentenced to death, but the sentence was later commuted to exile for life.

In August 1849, the Indus and Chenab rivers overflowed, and the heavily damaged citadel was washed away, eventually resembling an "island of mud" amidst the floods.

== Order of battle ==
=== British regiments ===
- 3rd King's Own Light Dragoons
- 9th Queen's Royal Light Dragoons (Lancers)
- 14th the King's Light Dragoons
- 6th Queen's Light Dragoons (Lancers)
- 10th Foot
- 24th Foot
- 29th Foot
- 32nd Foot
- 60th Foot 1st battalion
- 61st Foot

=== British Indian Army regiments ===
- 1st Bengal Light Cavalry
- 5th Bengal Light Cavalry
- 6th Bengal Light Cavalry
- 8th Bengal Light Cavalry
- 3rd Bengal Irregular Cavalry
- 9th Bengal Irregular Cavalry
- 11th Bengal Irregular Cavalry
- 14th Bengal Irregular Cavalry
- 2nd European Light Infantry
- 8th Bengal Native Infantry
- 15th Bengal Native Infantry
- 20th Bengal Native Infantry
- 25th Bengal Native Infantry
- 30th Bengal Native Infantry
- 31st Bengal Native Infantry
- 36th Bengal Native Infantry
- 45th Bengal Native Infantry
- 46th Bengal Native Infantry
- 51st Bengal Native Infantry
- 52nd Bengal Native Infantry
- 56th Bengal Native Infantry
- 69th Bengal Native Infantry
- 70th Bengal Native Infantry
- 72nd Bengal Native Infantry
- 4th Bombay Native Infantry
- 25th (Bombay) Mountain Battery

== Sources ==
- Ian Hernon, Britain's forgotten wars, Sutton Publishing Ltd, 2003, ISBN 0-7509-3162-0
- Charles Allen, Soldier Sahibs, Abacus, 2001, ISBN 0-349-11456-0
- "The Memoirs of Private Waterfield" ed Arthur Swinson (aka F M Bailey) & Donald Scott Cassell London 1968
