= 25th Mountain Battery =

- Active: 1827–1947
- Country: Indian Empire
- Branch: Army
- Type: Artillery
- Part of: Bombay Army (to 1895); Bombay Command
- Engagements: Second Sikh War; 1868 Expedition to Abyssinia; Second Burmese War; Sudan Campaign; Tirah Campaign; World War I Waziristan campaign 1936–1939; World War II

The 25th Mountain Battery was an artillery battery of the British Indian Army. Raised in 1827, as the Bombay Foot Artillery, the 25th is the oldest Indian Mountain Battery, and the only one that served in the Second Sikh War at the Siege of Multan. The 25th was also the first Battery to serve outside India, when it took part in the 1868 Expedition to Abyssinia. They next took part in the Second Burmese War. In 1896, the Battery was back in Africa, taking part in the Battle of Suakin in the Sudan Campaign. By 1897, the Battery had returned to the Frontier, and served in the Second Division of the Tirah Campaign. In World War I, The 25th served on the Frontier, the Persian Seistan Cordon in 1917 and during the last mopping up operations in the Mesopotamia Campaign in 1917–1918. During the inter-war years, the 25th only saw active service against the Fakir of Ipi in the Waziristan campaign 1936–1939.
