= Patrick Alexander Vans Agnew =

British Civil servant who was killed by the retainers of Diwan Mulraj Chopra

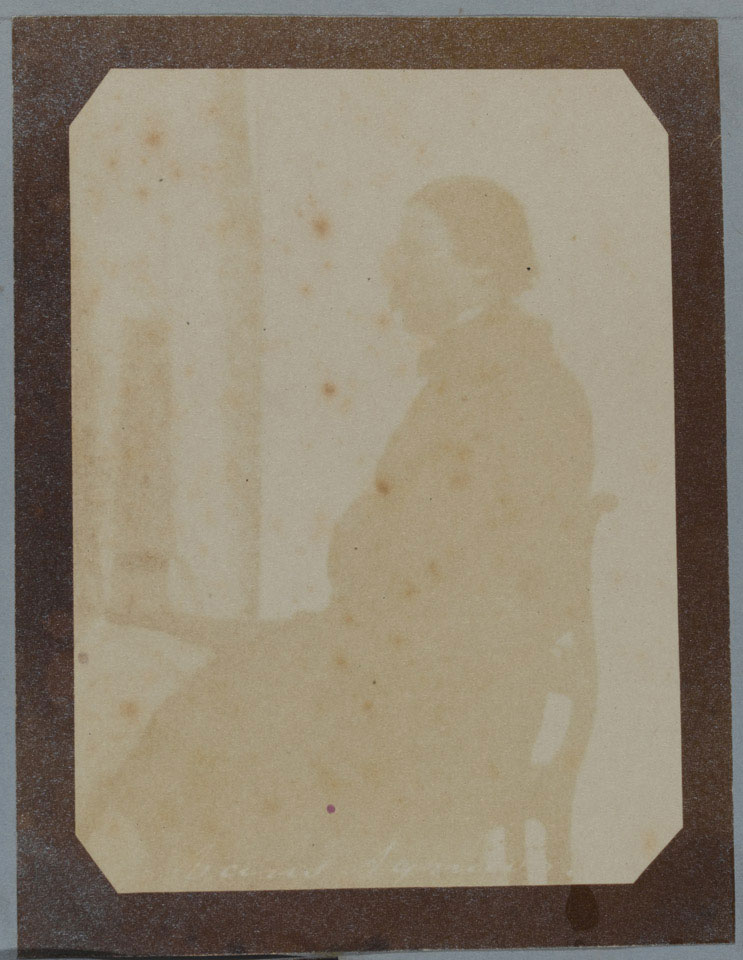
- Patrick Alexander Vans Agnew, photograph by John McCosh - Ferezopore 1848
- Born: April 21, 1822
- Relatives: Lt Col Patrick Vans Agnew (father)

Patrick Alexander Vans Agnew (22 April 1822 – 21 April 1848) was a British civil servant of the East India Company, whose murder in April 1848 during the Siege of Multan by the retainers of Dewan Mulraj led to the Second Sikh War and to the British annexation of the Punjab region.

== Background ==
Vans Agnew was born on the 22nd of April 1822 and was the second son of Lieutenant-Colonel Patrick Vans Agnew, a Madras officer of considerable reputation, and afterwards a director of the East India Company.

== East India Company ==
After a very successful career at Haileybury College, where he gave evidence of superior talent and of judgment and force of character in advance of his years, Agnew joined the Bengal civil service in March 1841, and in the following year commenced his official life as assistant to the commissioner of the Delhi Division. In December 1845 he was appointed assistant to Major George Broadfoot, the superintendent of the Cis-Sutlej states, and was present at the Battle of Sobraon early in 1846. He was subsequently employed in settling the boundaries of the territory of Maharaja Gulab Singh, the new ruler of Kashmir, and in a mission to Gilgit.

=== Annexation of Hazara ===
At the conclusion of the First Anglo-Sikh War in 1846 the Lahore Durbar ceded the territories of Kashmir and Hazara to the East India Company, the Company in turn were to turn over these territories to Gulab Singh, however in 1847 Gulab Singh formally returned Hazara to the Lahore government in exchange for territory near Jammu. The Lahore government was now under British control and influence and Captain James Abbott was appointed to assess, administer and pacify Hazara.

Vans Agnew's role in the region was to assist Abbott, take part in negotiations and help settle the border with Kashmir, in June 1847 Vans Agnew was en route to the area to settle with the Dhund tribe as part of the annexation - however in a journal entry dated 3 June 1847 Abbott wrote "Notice came to-day that Dewan Kurrum Chund having disobeyed the most positive prohibitions to move his troops further into the country of the Dhoonds, which Mr. Vans Agnew is actually en route to settle, had met with a shameful defeat from the armed peasantry." Abbott who was worried about this wrote the event could result in a general rising of the tribe.

On 13 June Abbott, who had halted at the Hazara border town of Garhi Habibullah (claimed by Gulab Singh as part of Kashmir) for a few days, finally received Vans Agnew and wrote the following about this: "I remained at this spot to enable Mr. Vans Agnew to rejoin me. During his absence all intercourse was cut off between us, for the Dhoonds, with whom that gentleman was negotiating, are too divided amongst themselves to be able to aid in the transmission of letters. I became rather anxious at Mr. Agnew’s protracted absence and silence, but on the evening of the 13th he joined my camp and gave me the particulars of his negotiation."

After Vans Agnew provided details of the area and the relationship between the tribes, Abbott wrote "Mr, Vans Agnew recommends that roads be made along the ridges leading in two directions into the heart of the country so as to render the passage of an army comparatively certain. This appears to me very sound advice of its feasibility I can better judge when I shall know more of the country".

According to Abbott - Vans Agnew described the Dhunds, with whom he been negotiating with as "intractable" and "conceited beyond measure". Abbott noted in his journal that the tribes were "in a state of rebellion", and that the "Syuds of the Dhoonds were [originally] conciliated by the Sikh Government with a jaghir and a yearly pension of 500 rupees, but this salary was extended to only two of the houses, and the third, Mhaitab Shah, was not provided for. He has come in to Mr. Agnew and lent him all the aid in his power, and I think it will be wise to follow Mr. Agnew’s suggestion and give him a salary of 250 rupees a year from the revenue of the Dhoond country on their return to allegiance."

Abbott later updated his journal to record that he had heeded Agnew's advice - at "the suggestion of Mr. Vans Agnew, in which I concur, I have paid in advance to the Syuds, Syud Shah and Shuiff Shah, one half of their yearly pension commencing with the rain crops of the current year not yet collected and given them a purwana assuring them that, on the return to allegiance of the Dhoonds, their salary shall be punctually paid them. I have also granted a purwana to the Syud Mhaitab Shah promising him a salary of 250 rupees yearly on return of the Dhoonds to allegiance."

== Deputation to Gilgit ==
After settlings affairs in Hazara, which mainly seems to be negotiating with the Dhunds to ensure administration of the area remains peaceful and also providing Abbott with advice and recommendations (such as payments to the tribes, road widening for the army), Vans Agnew begins to leave the area en route to Gilgit.

On the 21 June 1847 Vans Agnew notes in his diary that he, "Marched in company with Captain Abbott from Agrore to Khakee in Pukli, having to cross a low pass," he stops at Khakee for the night with Abbott. The next day while Abbott took the road back to Mansehra Vans Agnew marched to "Gurhee in the Koonharaki-Durra, nearly 20 miles", he "found Maharajah Golab Singh’s forces on their way to Moozuffurabad".

On 25 June Vans Agnew stopped at Muzaffarabad and was visited by Sooltan Hussein Khan, Agnew noted that Khan "complained that no attention had yet been paid to the grant of his jageer and rozina obtained by me from Dewan Jowala Sahaie [Dewan Jwala Sahai] at Rawal Pindi. Saw Kurrurn Chand, Kardar, who admitted the fact. Reported on affairs here to the Agent." Dewan Jwala Sahai was Gulab Singh's Chief Minister.

== Assassination in Multan ==
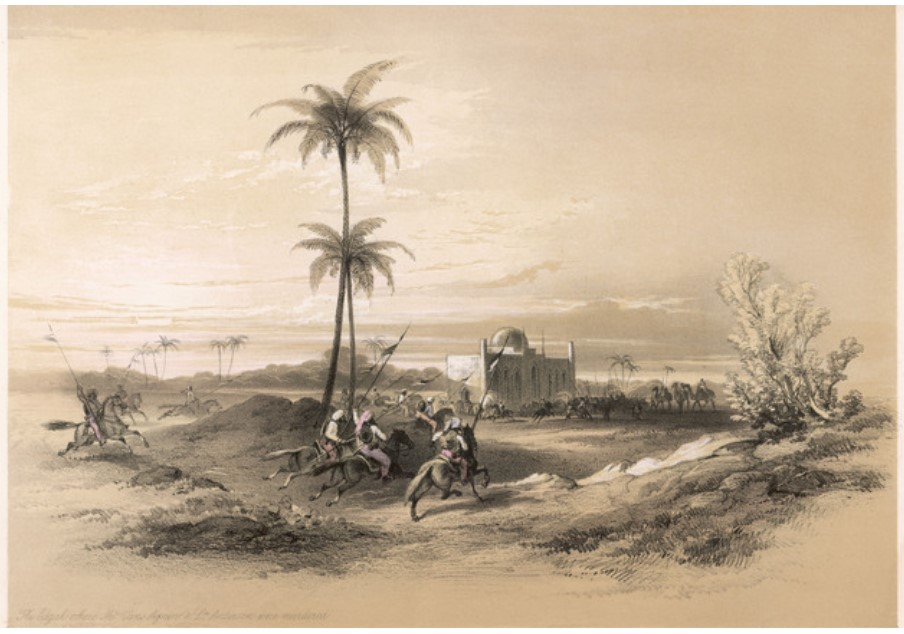
The Eedgah under the walls of Multan, where Mr. Van Agnew & Lt. Anderson were murdered, sketched by John Dunlop MD of the 32nd Foot.

In the spring of 1848, being then assistant to the resident at Lahore Sir Henry Lawrence, he was sent to Multan with instructions to take over the government of that province from Mulraj, the Nazim or governor, who had applied to be relieved of it, and to make it over to Sardar Kahan Singh Mann, a Sikh noble sympathetic to British interests, remaining himself in the capacity of political agent to introduce a new system of finance and revenue. On this mission he was accompanied by Lieutenant William A. Anderson, of the 1st. Bombay Fusilier Regiment, who had been his assistant on his mission to Gilgit, and also by Sardar Kahan Singh Mann, the governor designate, and an escort of Sikh troops. The mission reached Multan on 18 April 1848. On the following day Agnew and Anderson were visited by Mulraj, and some discussion, not altogether harmonious, took place as to the terms upon which the province should be given over, Agnew demanding that the accounts for the six previous years should be produced. On 20 April, the two English officers inspected Multan Fort and the various establishments, and on their return to their camp in company with Mulraj were attacked and wounded (Anderson severely) by the retainers of Mulraj, who immediately rode off at full speed to his country residence. The two wounded Englishmen were placed by their attendants in an idgah, or fortified mosque, where, on the following day, their Sikh escort having gone over to the enemy, they were brutally murdered by the adherents of Mulraj.

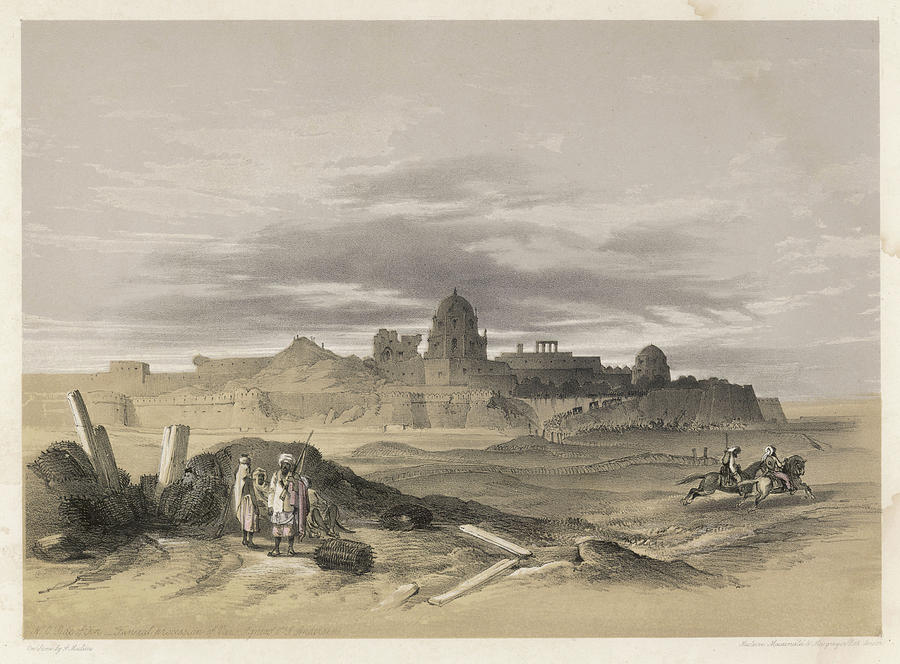
NE side of the Multan fort, showing the funeral procession of Vans Agnew and Anderson.

Volume III of The History of India published in 1867 by Victorian historian and journalist John Clark Marshman describes the initial assault as follows: "As they were returning from the fort and crossing the drawbridge, Mr. Agnew received a spear thrust under his arm, was thrown off his horse, and wounded in three places with a sword as he lay struggling with his assailant. Lieutenant Anderson was likewise suddenly surrounded and felled to the ground by assassins. Moolraj, who was riding side by side with Mr. Agnew at the time, immediately set spurs to his horse and rode off at full speed to his country residence, while the wounded officers were conveyed by their attendants to the Edgah. On the morning of the 20th, a brisk fire was opened upon it from the guns of the citadel, which was maintained throughout the day, and answered by the guns which had accompanied the party from Lahore. Mr. Agnew then despatched a letter appealing to the compassion of Moolraj, but he stated in reply that, although anxious to come to his assistance, he was restrained by the violence of his soldiery. He did not, however, refuse to allow them to fasten a war bracelet on his arm, and there could be no doubt of his complicity in this atrocious attempt to assassinate the British officers. Mr. Agnew and his companion were in hopes of being able to maintain their position until relief should arrive from Bunnoo or Bhawulpore, but their Sikh escort, which consisted of Goorkha soldiers, proved treacherous, and went" over to the enemy.

Marshman describes the men now abandoned by their escort "at the mercy of" what he describes as "a crew of howling savages", "Goojur Sing" is named as the man who "rushed upon Mr. Agnew, loaded him with the foulest abuse, and severed his head from his body at the third stroke, while the ruffians hacked Lieutenant Anderson to pieces. Their bodies were dragged out amid brutish yells; their heads were presented to Moolraj, and then tossed among the mob, filled with gunpowder, and blown to atoms."

This incident, so important in its political results, produced a profound sensation throughout India. Both the murdered officers, though young in years (Agnew would have been twenty-six had he lived one day longer), had already established a high reputation in the public service. Anderson had some time previously attracted the favourable notice of Sir Charles Napier in Sind, and the duties upon which Agnew had been employed, including his last most responsible and, as the event proved, fatal mission, sufficed to show the high estimation in which his services were held. Nor was it only as a rising public servant that Patrick Vans Agnew's death was mourned. In private life his brave, modest, and unselfish nature had won the esteem and affection of all who knew him. "If," wrote Sir Herbert Edwardes to one of his nearest relatives, "few of our countrymen in this land of death and disease have met more untimely ends than your brother, it has seldom been the lot of any to be so honoured and lamented."

== Monument ==
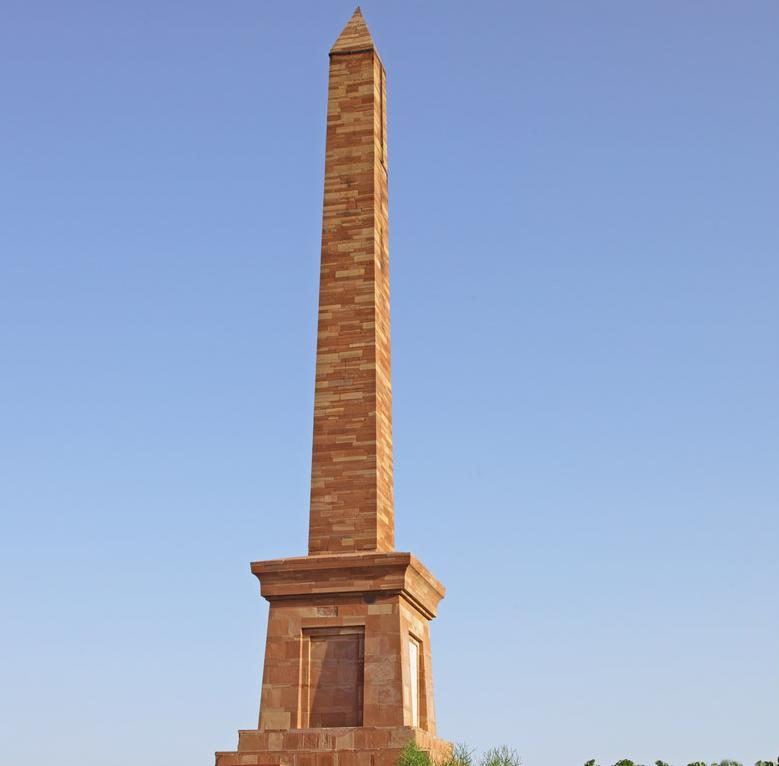
Vans Agnew's monument and grave at Multan Fort.

A monument was erected for Vans Agnew and Anderson, over their graves after the Siege of Multan. It stands in Ibne-Qasim Bagh, a park in Fort Kohna, Multan, at 30°11′55″N 71°28′29″E.
