= 4th Bombay Native Infantry =

4th Bombay Native Infantry may refer to:

- 107th Pioneers which was the 1st Battalion, 4th Bombay Native Infantry in 1796
- 108th Infantry which was the 2nd Battalion, 4th Bombay Native Infantry in 1796
- 104th Wellesley's Rifles which was the 4th Bombay Native Infantry in 1824
