= Mulraj Chopra =

Sikh governor of Multan (1814–1851)

Diwan Mul Raj Chopra
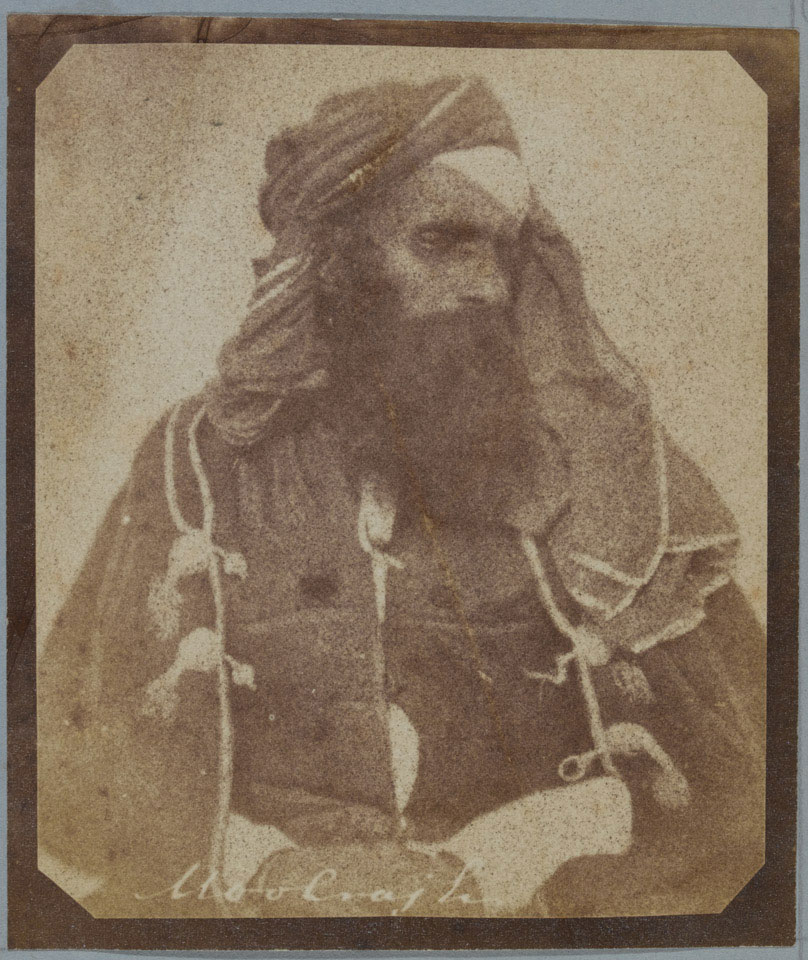
- Photograph of Dewan Mulraj in early 1848 during incarceration by the British

Sikh Diwan of Multan
- In office 1844 – 22 January 1849
- Monarch: Duleep Singh
- Preceded by: Diwan Sawan Mal Chopra
- Succeeded by: position abolished

Personal details
- Born: 1814
- Died: 11 August 1851 (aged 36–37) Buxar Jail, Buxar, Bengal Presidency
- Parent: Sawan Mal Chopra

Mulraj‌ Chopra‌ (1814 – 11 August 1851) was a Sikh Empire-era‌ administrator who served as the governor (Dewan) of Multan from 1844 to 1849. He is known for being the leader of a Sikh rebellion against the British during the siege of Multan which led to the Second Anglo-Sikh War.

== Early life ==
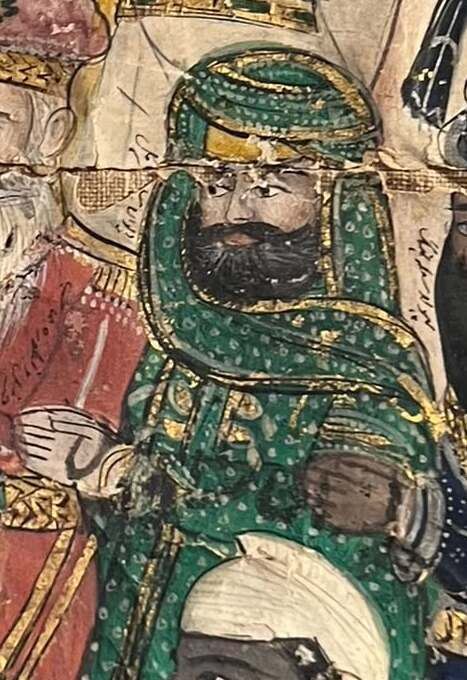
Diwan Sawan Mal, the father of Mulraj, detail of a painting, ca.1849–50

Mulraj Chopra was born to Diwan Sawan Mal, a Punjabi Hindu Khatri. His father Sawan Mal had attained distinction by capturing Multan from the Afghans and was made its Diwan by Ranjit Singh, the maharaja of the Sikh Empire. On his father's death, Mulraj succeeded him as the Diwan of Multan.

Trouble brewed in Multan following the murder of Diwan Sawan Mal in 1844. Sawan Mal had five sons, with the eldest son being Diwan Mulraj, who had been the governor of Jhang but was unpopular and succeeded his father's post at Multan. However, owing to the controversies following the First Anglo-Sikh War and internal factionalism in the Lahore court, Mulraj declined to pay his 30 lakhs succession fee. The British Acting Resident at Lahore agreed to a reduced cost of 20 lakhs but in-turn seized part of Jhang district and raised the revenue to be paid on the land held by Mulraj, who struggled to pay it over the years due to the excise duty of goods transported by river being abolished by the Resident, which Mulraj had relied on for funds. The resident also applied appellate power over decisions by Mulraj. The Resident was being advised by two adversaries of Mulraj, namely Raja Lal Singh and Mulraj's brother Karam Narain.

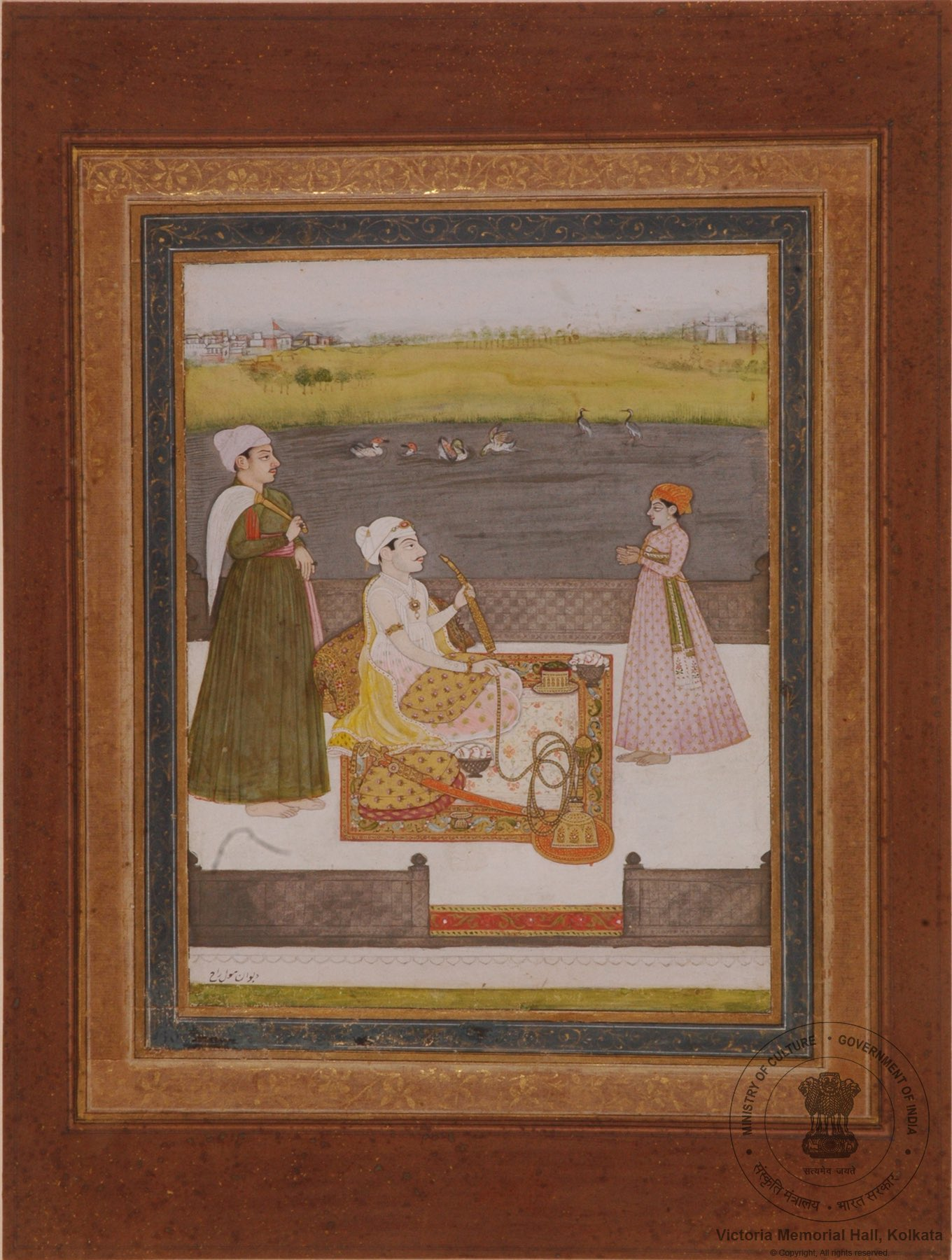
Miniature painting of a clean-shaved and youthful Diwan Mulraj Chopra seated atop a terrace accompanied by attendants

Owing to these pressures, Mulraj decided to resign from his duties in December 1847 but was urged to continue on until the winter harvest gathering in March 1848. The British used his resignation as an excuse to strengthen their influence in the region, with Kahan Singh Man being appointed as the successor but real power lying with Vans Agnew of the Civil Service and Lt. Anderson of the European Fusiliers, being accompanied to Multan by a force of fourteen hundred Durbar troops, a Gurkha regiment of infantry, seven hundred cavalry and one hundred artillerymen with six guns. When the Englishmen, Kahan Singh, and their forces arrived, Mulraj ordered his officers to welcome them and handed his keys to Multan fort to them, which was inspected by the new arrivals on 19 April 1848. The Englishmen decided to dismiss the Multani garrison at the fort and replace them with the Gurkha infantry. While Mulraj was escorting the Englishmen to the gate of the fort, an angered member of the Multani garrison which had just been removed from their duties named Amir Chand was offended by the order to offer salaam to the Sahibs who had made the order that caused him to lose his job decided to lunge at Vans Agnew with his spear and pierced Agnew's side. The next day on 20 April 1848, the camp of the British at the Idgah was mobbed by the upset locals, with Agnew being beheaded by a Mazhabi Nihang Sikh named Godar Singh and Anderon being killed by the mob by being hacked into pieces. Agnew's severed head was used as a football by the mob, being set on-fire, urinated, and spat upon. Godar Singh threatened the British that he will kill all of them as far as Calcutta. Mulraj, who had a timid disposition, soon found himself being seen as the leader of this rebellion with little choice in the matter.

== The Sikh revolt ==
One of the first acts of the new British Resident in Lahore, Sir Frederick Currie, was to raise taxes. This move caused widespread resentment, particularly in Multan, where Mulraj had remained steadfastly loyal to Ranjit Singh and his family. To counter the resentment, British officials sought to replace Mulraj with Sardar Kahan Singh Mann, an official from the court at Lahore who was more sympathetic to their interests.

On 18 April 1848, Kahan Singh arrived at the gates of Multan, accompanied by Patrick Vans Agnew of the Bengal Civil Service and Lieutenant William Anderson from the Bombay Fusilier Regiment. They were supported by a small escort of Gurkhas. The next day, Mulraj was to present the keys of the city to the two British officers. As the two officers began to ride out of the citadel, a soldier from Mulraj's Sikh army attacked Vans Agnew. This may have been the sign for a concerted attack, as a mob surrounded and attacked them. Mulraj's troops either stood by, or joined the mob. Both officers were wounded, and took refuge in a mosque outside the city, where Anderson wrote a plea for help. Mulraj had probably not been a party to the conspiracy among his own troops. He nevertheless regarded himself as committed to rebellion by their actions. The poet Hakim Chand recites, "Then the mother of Mulraj spoke to him reminding him of the Sikh Gurus and martyrs: "I will kill myself leaving a curse on your head. Either lead your men to death or get out of my sight; (and) I shall undertake the Khalsa army and go to the battle ...". She tied a bracelet on his wrist and sent him to the battle. Next morning, the mob hacked the two British officers to death. Mulraj presented Vans Agnew's head to Kahan Singh and told him to take it back to Currie at Lahore.

== Second Anglo-Sikh War ==
The events at Multan provided a casus belli for the British and led to the Second Anglo-Sikh War. Mulraj was portrayed as a blood-thirsty despot intent on the overthrow of Duleep Singh and his British allies. British officials hoped that by portraying Mulraj as an enemy of the Maharaja other influential Sikhs would refrain from joining his rebellion. Mulraj was however soon reinforced by several other regiments of the Khalsa, the former army of the Sikh kingdom, which rebelled or deserted. A Sikh saint Maharaj Singh played a key role in directing deserted Khalsa soldiers to Multan in support of Mulraj. He also took other measures to strengthen his defences, digging up guns which had previously been buried and enlisting more troops.

In early June, Herbert Edwardes, who was based in Bannu near to Multan, mustered a group of Pashtun irregulars and confronted Mulraj's troops at the Battle of Kinyeri on 18 June. Edwardes's troops were engaged by Mulraj's artillery and forced to take cover for several hours. Mulraj's infantry and cavalry began to advance but Edwardes was reinforced by two regiments under Colonel Van Cortlandt, an Anglo-Indian soldier of fortune. Van Cortlandt's artillery caused heavy losses among the Multani troops and Edwardes's Pashtuns counter-attacked. Mulraj's forces retreated to Multan, having suffered 500 casualties and lost six guns.

=== The siege of Multan ===
The East India Company's Bengal Army under General Whish began the siege of Multan. but it was too small to encircle the city, Currie decided to reinforce them with a substantial detachment of the Khalsa under Sher Singh Attariwalla. Sher Singh's father, Chattar Singh Attariwalla, was openly preparing to revolt in Hazara to the north of the Punjab. On 14 September, Sher Singh also rebelled against the East India Company and joined the revolt. However, Dewan Mulraj and Sher Singh could not agree to combine their forces and fought separately against the British.

On 27 December, Whish ordered four columns of troops to attack the suburbs of the city. Mulraj's forces were driven back into the city, and Whish's force set up batteries 500 yards from the city walls causing great damage in the city. On 30 December, the main magazine in the citadel exploded, killing 800 of the defenders. Mulraj nevertheless maintained his fire and sent a defiant message to Whish, stating that he still had enough powder to last a year. He attempted to mount a sortie against the besiegers on 31 December but this was driven back.

=== The surrender ===
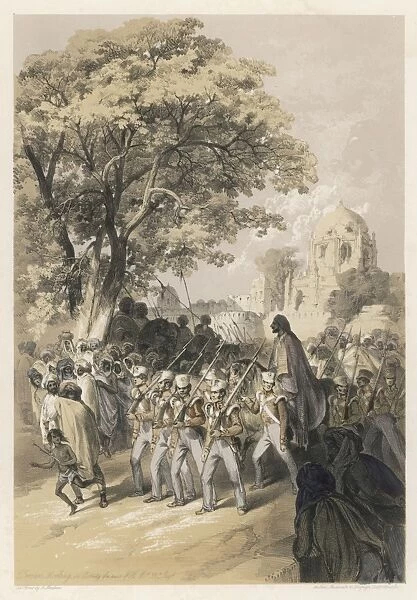
Sikh rebel Dewan Mulraj in custody after the defeat of Sikh forces in Multan

Whish ordered a general assault on 2 January 1849. The attackers successfully scaled the breaches, and the battle became a bloody house-to-house fight in the city, in which many defenders and civilians were killed indiscriminately. Mulraj offered to surrender if the citizens of Multan were spared, but Whish insisted on unconditional surrender, and on 22 January, Mulraj gave himself up, with 550 men. The British gained vast quantities of loot. Mulraj's treasury was worth three million pounds, a huge sum for the time. There was also much looting in the town, by both British and Indian soldiers. With the fall of Multan, Whish's army was able to reinforce the main Bengal Army force under Sir Hugh Gough. Whish's heavy guns were decisive at the Battle of Gujrat, which effectively broke Sher Singh's and Chattar Singh's armies and ended the Second Anglo-Sikh War.

== Imprisonment and death ==
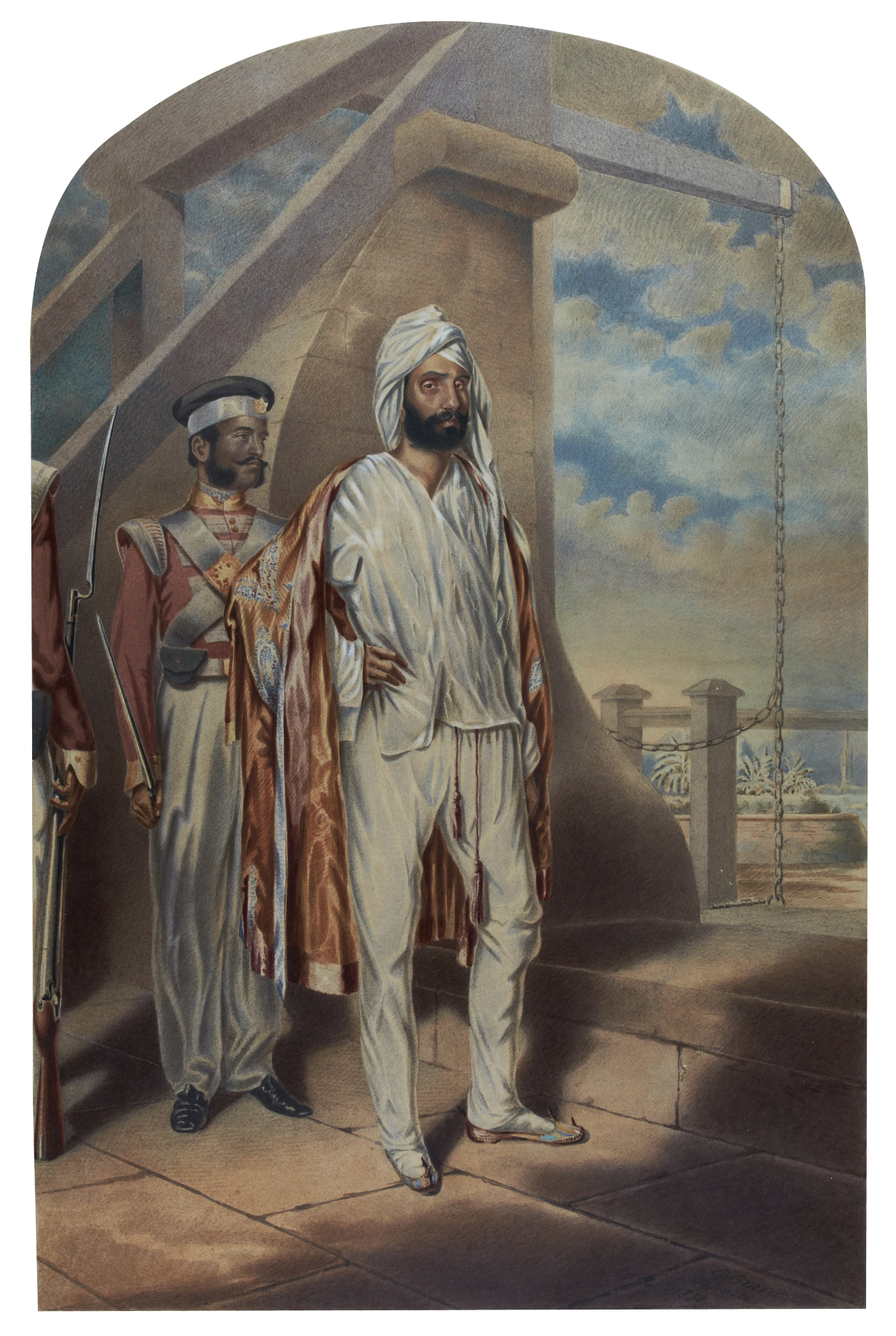
Portrait by Colesworthey Grant of Diwan Mulraj Chopra held captive in Calcutta (1851)

Mulraj was placed on trial for the murders of Vans Agnew and Anderson. Whilst awaiting trial, Mulraj was kept under the custody of John Spencer Login who remarked to his wife that Mulraj seemed not to be the bloodthirsty despot described in the papers." According to Khushwant Singh, his trial was a farce and Lord Dalhousie had already decided Mulraj was guilty, who stated the following three months before Mulraj's hearing: "‘I cannot hang him, but I will do what he will think a thousand times worse: I will send him across the sea, what they call 'black water' and dread far more than death."

The court consisted of three Englishmen. Mulraj was cleared of premeditated murder, but was found guilty of being an accessory for the murder of two officers due to having rewarded the murderers and openly using the deaths as pretext for rebellion. He was sentenced to death, but the sentence was later commuted to exile for life. He was due to be banished to Singapore but was instead incarcerated at Fort William in Calcutta, Bengal as he suffered a bout of dysentery while waiting for his boat to arrive. Mulraj requested to die at Benaras, which was agreed to.

Later he was to be moved to Benares but he died on route at Buxar jail near on 11 August 1851 after falling ill. His body was cremated on the banks of the Ganges river by a handful of loyal servants.

== See also ==
- First Anglo-Sikh War
- Second Anglo-Sikh War
- Siege of Multan
