= Second Anglo-Sikh War =

1848–49 conflict between the British and Sikh empires

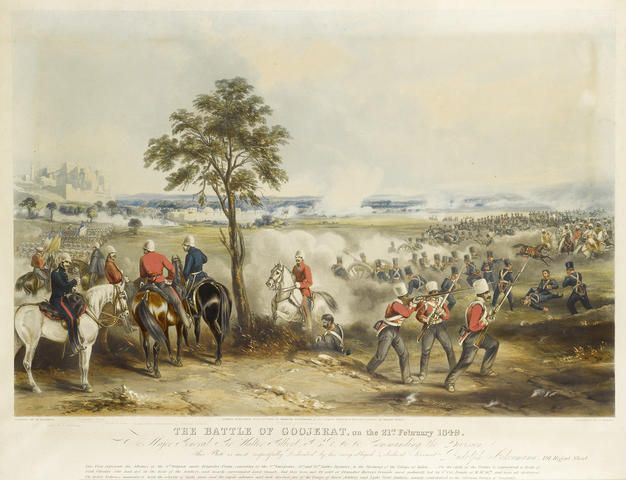
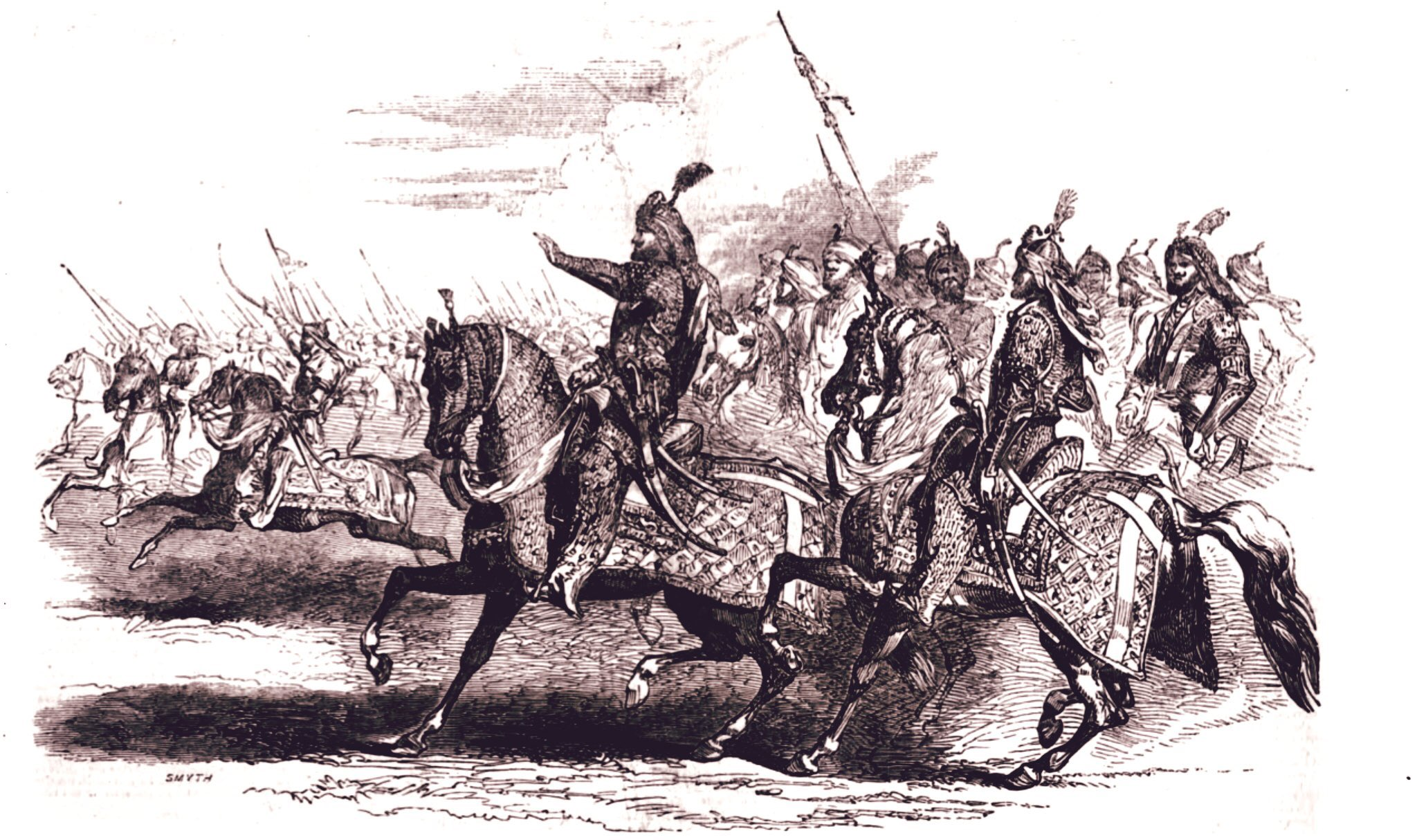
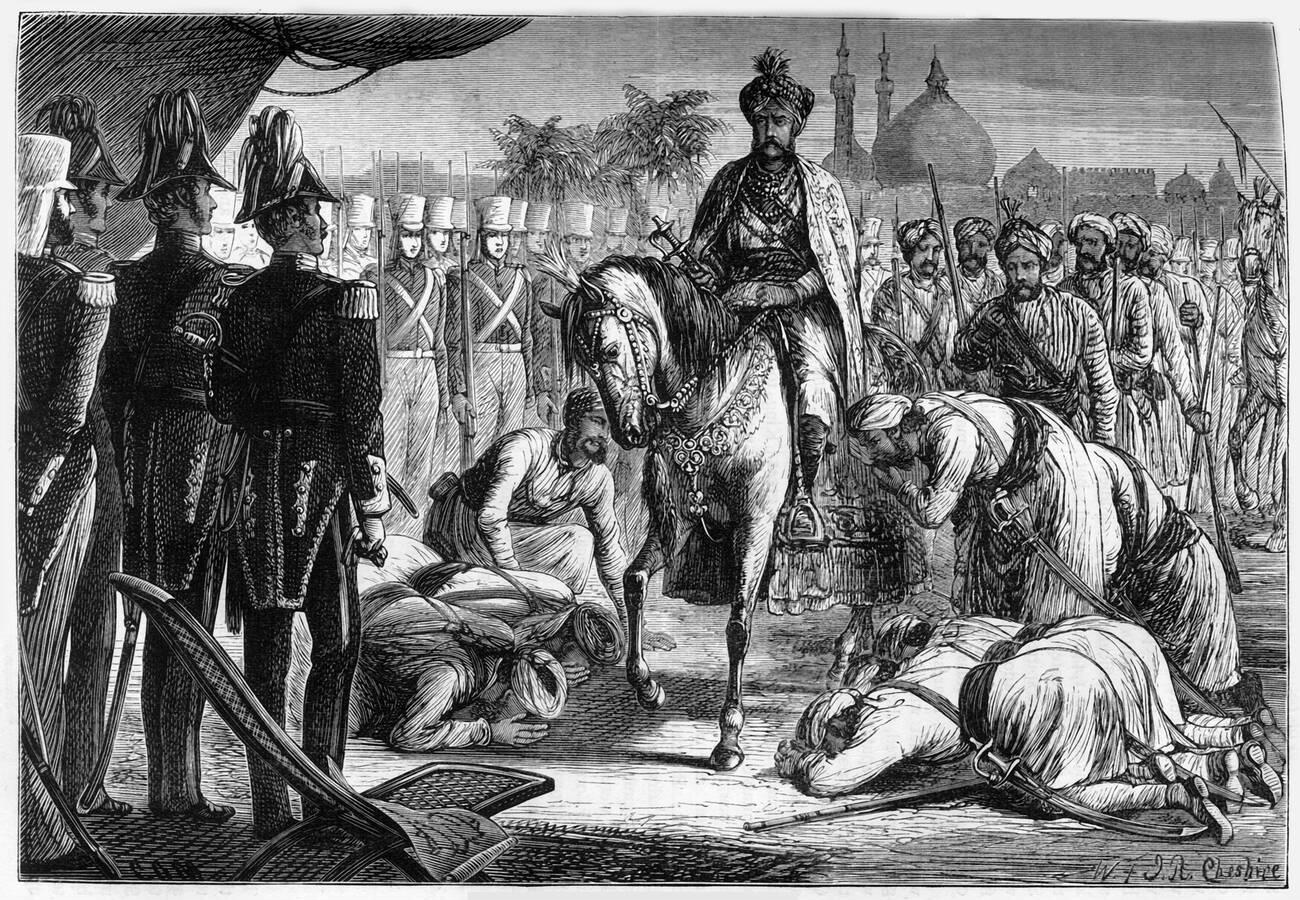
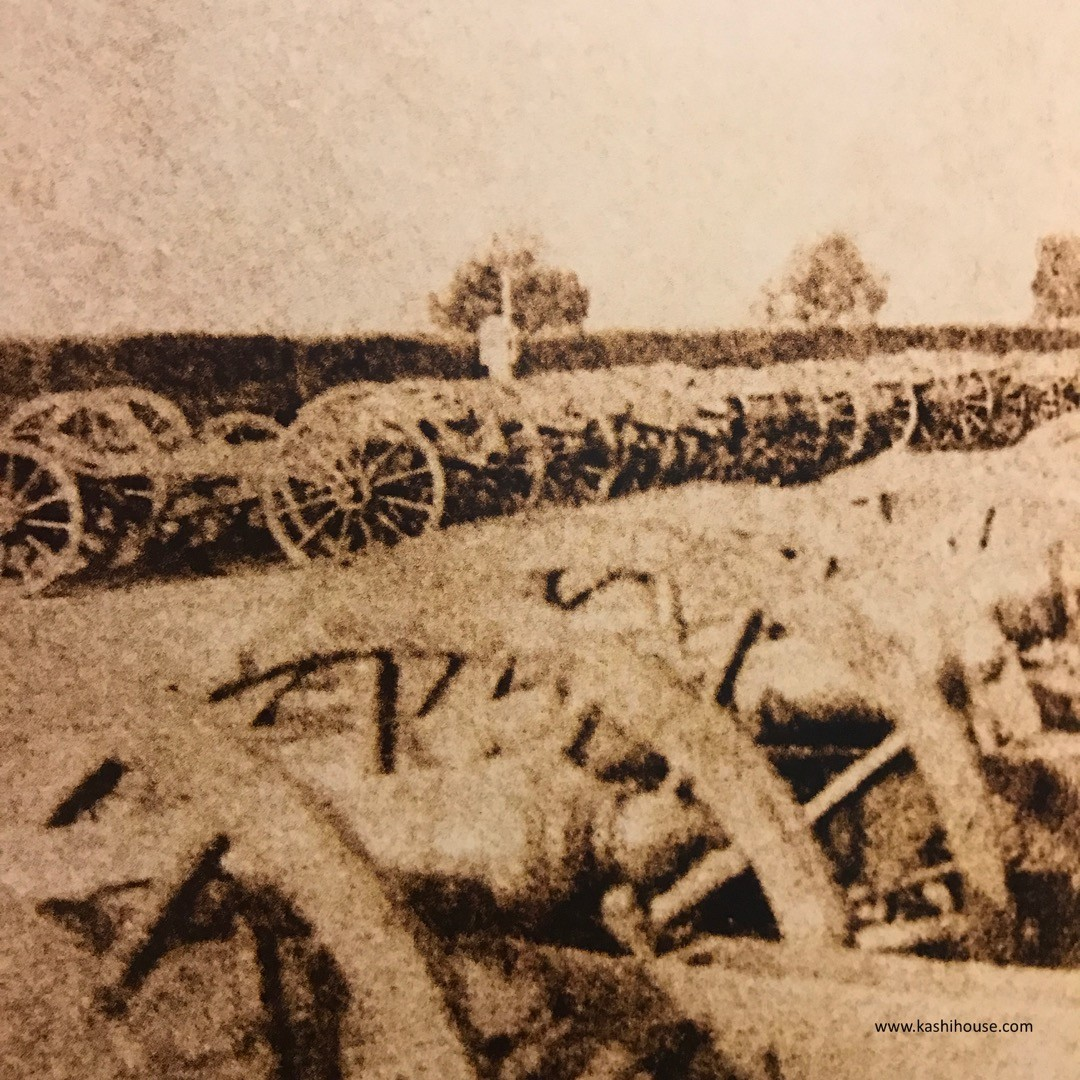
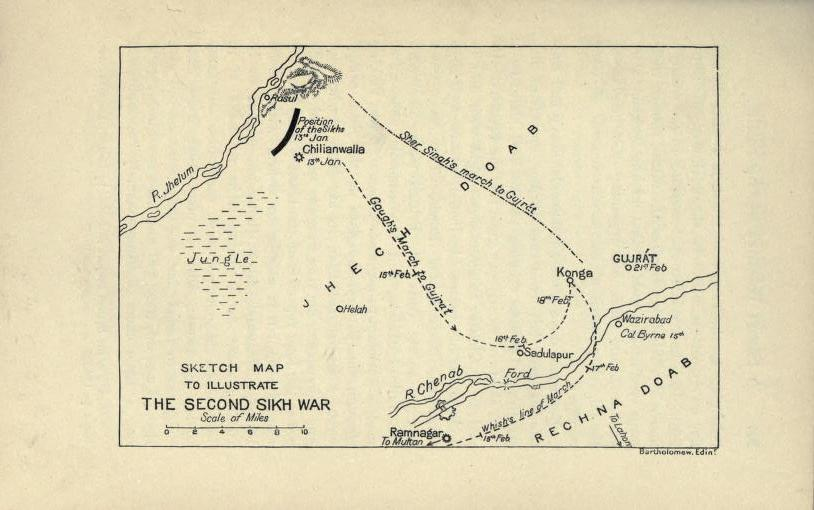
- Part of Anglo-Sikh wars: Battle of Gujrat; Sher Singh Attariwalla leading a cavalry charge; Surrender of the governor of Multan, Mulraj Chopra, during the siege of Multan; Captured Sikh guns in Ambala Cantonment; Sketch map illustrating the war by Charles Herbert Payne
Date	18 April 1848 – 29 March 1849 (11 months, 1 week and 4 days)
Location	Punjab
Result	British victory
Territorial changes	Dissolution of the Sikh Empire and annexation of Punjab (including its Northwest Frontier) as a province by the East India Company

Belligerents
(United Kingdom of Great Britain and Ireland) British Empire; East India Company	Sikh Empire; Supported by:

Commanders and leaders
(United Kingdom of Great Britain and Ireland) Sir Hugh Gough (United Kingdom of Great Britain and Ireland) Charles Cureton † (East India Company) Herbert Edwardes (East India Company) Walter Gilbert	Jind Kaur (surrendered); Diwan Chopra (surrendered); Sher Singh (surrendered); Chattar Singh (surrendered)

Strength
24,000-32,000 men 97 field guns 67 siege guns	35,000-60,000 men 66 guns

Casualties and losses
Total: 8,403; 3,379 killed 4,920 wounded 104 missing	Total: 6,500; 2,584 killed 2,583 wounded 1,333 missing

The Second Anglo-Sikh War was a military conflict fought between the Sikh Empire and the East India Company, which took place from 1848 to 1849. It resulted in the fall of the Sikh Empire, and the annexation of the Punjab and what subsequently became the North-West Frontier Province, by the East India Company.

On 19 April 1848, Patrick Vans Agnew of the civil service and Lieutenant William Anderson of the Bombay European regiment, having been sent to take charge of Multan from Diwan Mulraj Chopra, were murdered there; within a short time, the Sikh troops joined in open rebellion. Governor-General of India Lord Dalhousie agreed with Sir Hugh Gough, the commander-in-chief, that the British East India Company's military forces were neither adequately equipped with transport and supplies, nor otherwise prepared to take the field immediately. He also foresaw the spread of the rebellion, and the necessity that must arise, not merely for the capture of Multan, but also for the entire subjugation of the Punjab. He therefore resolutely delayed to strike, organized a strong army for operations in November, and himself proceeded to the Punjab. Despite the brilliant successes gained by Herbert Edwardes against Mulraj, and Gough's indecisive victories at the Battle of Ramnagar in November and at the Battle of Chillianwala on 13 January 1849, the stubborn resistance at Multan showed that the task required the utmost resources of the government. At length, on 22 January, Multan was taken by General Whish, who was thus set at liberty to join Gough's army. On 21 February, Gough won a complete victory at the Battle of Gujrat. The Sikh army was pursued to Rawalpindi, where it laid down its arms, and their Afghan allies retreated from the Punjab, leaving the region to the British.

After the victory at Gujrat, Lord Dalhousie annexed the Punjab for the East India Company in 1849. For his services the Earl of Dalhousie received the thanks of the British parliament and was advanced in the peerage to marquess, the usual honor for governors general of India.

== Background ==
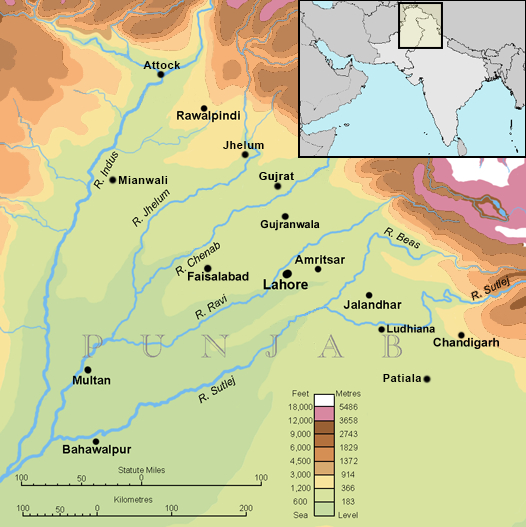
Topographical map of The Punjab, "Land of 5 Waters"

The Sikh Confederacy Misls of the Punjab were consolidated into an Empire and expanded by Maharaja Ranjit Singh during the early years of the nineteenth century. During the same period, the British East India Company's territories had been expanded until they were adjacent to the Punjab. Ranjit Singh maintained an uneasy alliance with the East India Company, while increasing the military strength of the Sikh Khalsa Army to deter British aggression against his state and to expand Sikh territory to the north and north west, capturing territory from Afghanistan and Kashmir.

When Ranjit Singh died in 1839, the Sikh Empire began to fall into disorder. There was a succession of short-lived rulers at the central Durbar (court), and increasing tension between the Army, which also saw itself as the embodiment of the state and religion, and the Durbar. The East India Company began to build up its military strength on the borders of the Punjab. Eventually, the increasing tension goaded the Sikh Army to invade British territory, under weak and possibly treacherous leaders.

The hard-fought First Anglo-Sikh War ended in defeat for the Sikh Empire which had to cede parts of the Punjab region to the British.

=== Aftermath of the First Anglo-Sikh War ===
At the end of the war, the Sikh Empire was forced to cede some valuable territory (the Jullundur Doab) to the East India Company, and Gulab Singh, the ruler of Jammu, was allowed to acquire entire Jammu and Kashmir from the Sikh Empire by a large cash payment to the East India Company. Moreover, a British garrison began stationing in Lahore due to the Treaty of Bhairowal, and Sir Henry Lawrence was appointed as the first Resident in Lahore. The boy Maharaja Duleep Singh of the Sikh Empire was allowed to retain his throne, but the British Resident had "full authority to direct and control all matters in every Department of the State".

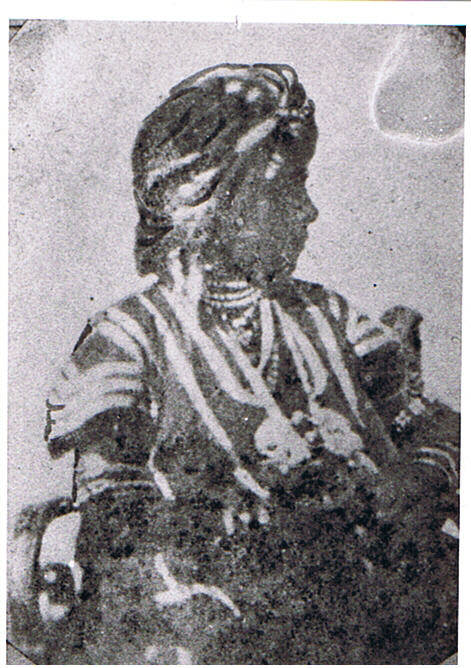
Photograph of Maharaja Duleep Singh during his reign as a child monarch of the Sikh Empire, by John McCosh, Lahore, ca.1848

The regency of Maharani Jind Kaur, who is Duleep Singh's mother, was replaced by a Council of Regency composed of leading Chiefs and Sirdars acting under the control and guidance of the British Resident. She continually tried to regain some of her former influence as Regent and was eventually exiled by Lawrence. While some Sikh generals and courtiers welcomed her dismissal, others resented Lawrence's action. Furthermore, the Sikh Sardars were forced to considerably reduce their territorial and judicial control leaving only four Sardars in charge of the judiciary, with Sardar Chattar Singh Attariwalla controlling the area between the Jhelum and the Indus, Sardar Kahan Singh Mann controlling Lahore, Sardar Ram Singh Jallawala controlling the Chaj Doab, and Sardar Lehna Singh Majithia controlling the Majha including lands south east of the Ravi up to the hills and down to Kasur.

Some of the Sikh Army had to be kept in being, since many predominantly Muslim areas of the Sikh Empire threatened to ally with Dost Mohammed Khan in Afghanistan or to lapse into disorder, and only force of arms could keep them in subjugation. The British were unwilling to incur the financial and manpower costs of using large numbers of British or Bengal Army units for this task. To the contrary, the Governor-General of India, Viscount Hardinge sought to make economies after the war by reducing the size of the Bengal Army by 50,000 men. The Sardars (generals) of the Sikh Army naturally resented carrying out the orders of comparatively junior British administrators.

Early in 1848, Sir Henry Lawrence, who was ill, departed on leave to England. Although it was assumed that his younger brother John Lawrence would be appointed in his place, Lord Dalhousie, who had replaced Lord Hardinge as Governor-General, appointed Sir Frederick Currie instead. Currie was a legalist, based in Calcutta, who was unfamiliar with military matters and with the Punjab. While the Lawrences were comparatively informal and familiar with the junior officers who were Residents and Agents in the various districts of the Punjab, Currie was stiffer in manner and was inclined to treat his subordinates' reports with caution. In particular, he refused to act on reports from James Abbott, the Political Agent in Hazara, who was convinced that Sardar Chattar Singh Attariwalla was actively plotting a rebellion with other Sirdars.

== Sikh rebellions ==
=== Multan rebellion ===
The city of Multan was part of the Sikh kingdom, having been captured by Ranjit Singh in 1818. In 1848, it was governed by a Punjabi viceroy, Dewan Mulraj. After the end of the First Anglo-Sikh war, Mulraj had behaved independently. When he was required by the British-controlled Durbar in Lahore to pay an increased tax assessment and revenues which were in arrears, Mulraj attempted to give up power to his son, so as to maintain his family's position as rulers. Currie instead appointed Sardar Kahan Singh Mann to succeed to the governorship and appointed a British Political Agent, Lieutenant Patrick Vans Agnew, to accompany him.

On 18 April 1848, Kahan Singh and Vans Agnew arrived at Multan with another officer, Lieutenant William Anderson, and a small escort. Mulraj handed over the keys of the fortress, but as Vans Agnew's party attempted to take possession, they were attacked by a party of Mulraj's irregular troops, and a mob from the city. Both officers were wounded, and were rescued by Kahan Singh. They were taken to a mosque outside the city. Their escorts defected to Mulraj, and the two officers were murdered by the mob the next day.

Mulraj later claimed that he had not instigated these attacks, but he was committed to rebellion because of them. He presented Vans Agnew's head to Kahan Singh and told him to take it back to Lahore. The news of the killings spread over the Punjab, and unrest and disquiet increased. Large numbers of Sikh soldiers deserted the regiments loyal to the Durbar to join those prepared to rebel under the leadership of Mulraj and disaffected Sirdars.

==== Battle of Kinyeri ====
Lieutenant Herbert Edwardes, the British Political Agent in Bannu, had been near Multan in April but was unable to save Vans Agnew. He hastily levied some Pakhtun irregular troops.

On 18 June 1848, 8,000 Bhawalpuris under Futteh Mohammed Khan, aided by 3,000 Sikh irregulars under Lieutenant Edwardes, fought 8,000 Sikhs under Rung Ram. The Bhawalpuris were repulsed in an attack on the Sikh positions, but the arrival of Lieutenant Edwardes' guns turned the scale towards the favour of the Bhawalpuris, and at a second attempt the entrenchments were stormed and captured, with a loss to the victors of 300 men. The Sikhs lost 500 killed in the action, and many more during their flight to Multan.

==== Battle of Suddusain ====
Fought 1 July 1848, when a force of Bhawalpuris and British 18,000 strong, under Lieutenant Edwardes, encountered 12,000 Sikhs under Malraj. The Sikhs attacked, but were beaten off, largely owing to the superiority of the British artillery, and defeated with heavy loss. The Bhawalpuris then proceeded to chase the remaining scattered Sikhs all the way to Multan.

==== Siege of Multan ====
Multan, defended by the Sikhs, under Mulraj, was besieged by Lieutenant Edwardes with about 1,200 men in July 1848.

On learning of the events at Multan, Currie wrote to Sir Hugh Gough, the Commander in Chief of the Bengal Army, recommending that a major British force should at once move upon Multan. However Gough, supported by Dalhousie, the Governor General, declined to order major units of the East India Company to the Punjab until the end of the hot weather and monsoon seasons, which would not be until November. Instead, Currie ordered only a small force from the Bengal Army under General Whish, and several contingents of locally recruited irregulars and detachments of the Sikh Khalsa Army to join the siege. These forces joined Edwardes at Multan between 18 and 28 August. To the alarm of several Political Agents, the force from the Sikh Army included a large contingent commanded by Sardar Sher Singh Attariwalla, Chattar Singh's son.

Some Political Agents were already taking action to forestall outbreaks of rebellion. Captain John Nicholson, leading irregular cavalry based at Peshawar, seized the vital fort of Attock on the Indus River from its Sikh garrison while they were still unprepared, or undecided on rebellion. Nicholson's force then linked up with James Abbott's local Hazara levies to capture the Margalla Hills which separated Hazara from the other parts of the Punjab. When Chattar Singh openly rebelled in August, his force was unable to leave Hazara without fighting a battle. Although Chattar Singh twice succeeded in capturing the passes through the hills, he nevertheless failed to take advantage of this (possibly because of dissension among his senior officers and continual harassment by pro-British irregulars), and retreated into Hazara.

On 14 September, Sher Singh's army openly rebelled at Multan. He did not join Mulraj however. He and Mulraj conferred at a carefully chosen neutral site, at which it was agreed that Mulraj would give some money from his treasury to Sher Singh's army, which would march north into the Central Punjab and ultimately rejoin Chattar Singh. Meanwhile, Whish was forced to raise the siege on 22 September.

As the cold weather began in November, substantial contingents from the East India Company's armies at last took the field. A contingent from the Bombay Army (administered separately from the Bengal Army) had been ordered to reinforce Whish and besiege Multan. This force was delayed by a petty squabble over seniority and could arrive only when its first commander (who was senior to Whish and refused to serve under him) was replaced by a more junior officer. Whish's army was supplied and reinforced by sea and river transport up the rivers Indus and Chenab. Whish renewed the siege of Multan on 27 December, with 17,000 men and 64 guns. After a heavy bombardment the city was stormed on 2 January 1849. On 22 January, Mulraj surrendered the citadel. He was imprisoned for the remainder of his life. The ending of the siege allowed Whish, with large numbers of heavy guns, to reinforce the army under Sir Hugh Gough.

The British loss during the siege was 210 killed and 910 wounded.

=== Lahore rebellion ===
==== Battle of Rungur Muzl Fort ====
Rungur Muzl fort was controlled by Sher Singh Attariwalla and was the first sign of revolt from the Lahore Durbar. The Sikhs from the army saw the British troops coming in and attacked them with full force. The Sikhs won the battle but soon they surrendered as there was a very small force.

==== Siege of Shahpur Kandi Fort ====
On the night of 14 August 1848, Wazir Ram Singh Pathania with his small Rajput army attacked the fort of Shahpur Kandi which was situated on the bank of river Ravi and held it, but after the siege of fort from 3 to 18 September 1848 by a strong force of John Lawrence from Hoshiarpur, he along with 400 of his band took shelter at Rasual (Gujrat) Camp of The Sikh Commander Sher Singh Attariwalla and Basakha Singh.

==== Battle of Ramnagar ====
Sir Hugh Gough led his main force against Sher Singh's army, which defended the line of the River Chenab for several weeks. On 22 November, the Sikhs repelled a British cavalry attack on a bridgehead on the eastern side of the river at the Battle of Ramnagar. Although they subsequently withdrew from their exposed bridgehead, the Sikhs captured a British gun and inflicted heavy losses. They regarded the battle as a victory and their morale was raised.

==== Battle of Sadulpur ====
On 3 December 1848, Gough despatched a cavalry force under Major General Joseph Thackwell to cross the Chenab upstream of Ramnagar and turn the Sikh left, but Thackwell then paused to await infantry reinforcements, allowing the Sikhs to withdraw without interference. Gough claimed this indecisive action as a victory.

==== Battle of Chillianwala ====
At the start of 1849, Amir Dost Mohammed Khan of Afghanistan sided with the rebellious Sikhs, who agreed to cede the city of Peshawar and its surrounding area which had been conquered by Ranjit Singh early in the nineteenth century. Dost Mohammed Khan's support of the Sikhs was cautious, but when 3,500 Afghan horsemen approached the vital fort of Attock on the Indus River, its garrison of Muslim troops installed earlier by Nicholson defected. This allowed Chattar Singh to move out of Hazara and march west and then south, intending to link up with Sher Singh's army. Dalhousie had earlier ordered Gough to halt operations while waiting for Multan to fall, which would allow Whish to reinforce him. Learning of the fall of Attock, he instead ordered Gough to destroy Sher Singh's army before Chattar Singh could join him.

Gough unexpectedly encountered Sher Singh's position near the Jhelum River on 13 January 1849. Sher Singh had cunningly concealed his army, and Gough was faced with the choice of withdrawing, or attacking when it was late in the day. Gough unhesitatingly took the latter course. The resulting Battle of Chillianwala was desperately fought. Gough's troops, attacking into thick scrub without effective artillery support, suffered heavy losses. Some units lost their colours (which was regarded as a disgrace) and part of one British cavalry regiment fled in panic, resulting in the loss of four guns, also reckoned a humiliation. Sher Singh's army was also hard hit, losing twelve of its own guns.

Three days of heavy rain followed, discouraging both sides from renewing battle. After both armies had faced each other for three days without renewing the action, both withdrew. Sher Singh continued northwards to join Chattar Singh, which made the battle into a strategic British defeat. Gough nevertheless claimed a victory, which Dalhousie scornfully dubbed as "perhaps poetical."

There was much alarm at the losses Gough had suffered. His tactics were severely criticised. Military experts in Britain described him as a "superannuated general who could not mount his horse without assistance" and he was replaced by General Charles James Napier, who would require several weeks to arrive from England. Some junior officers reckoned that the true cause of the setback lay lower down the ranks. Promotion in both the British and Bengal armies came slowly, and by the time officers were appointed to command regiments and brigades, they were too old, and worn out by harsh climate and disease. At Chillianwala, several senior officers had proved unable to command their units effectively.

==== Battle of Dullah ====
In the aftermath of Chillianwala, Sher Singh Attariwalla sent a force of 100 cavalries along with 500 infantry of the Sikh Regiment and fought another battle with British on 16 January 1849 at Heights of Dullah, the Sikh chiefs supported Ram Singh Pathania and his Rajput men. In return, the British sent a huge force under the command of Brigadier Wheeler.

==== Battle of Gujrat ====
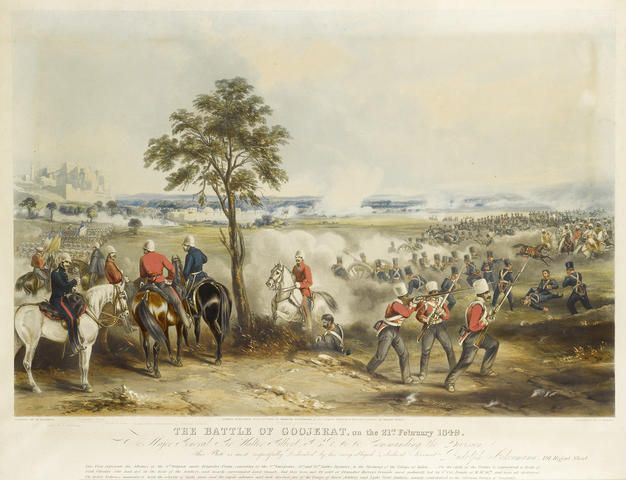
The Battle of Gujrat, the most decisive battle of the second Anglo-Sikh war

Meanwhile, Whish's force completed their siege works around Multan, their batteries opened fire and made a breach in the defences, which the infantry stormed. Mulraj surrendered on 22 January. The ending of the siege allowed Whish to reinforce Gough. In particular, Whish's division had large numbers of heavy guns, which the Sikhs lacked.

As Gough's army closed in on the Sikh Army, he sent William Hodson to scout the Sikh Army's position. Sher Singh attempted a last outflanking move, sending cavalry to cross the Chenab, and re-cross in Gough's rear. They were thwarted by heavy rains which made the river difficult to cross, and by British irregular cavalry led by Harry Burnett Lumsden. On 21 February, Gough attacked the Sikh Army at the Battle of Gujrat. Here, he began the battle with a three-hour bombardment from almost 100 guns, which drove the Sikhs from their hasty entrenchments. He then sent his cavalry, led by Sir Joseph Thackwell, and horse artillery after them in a pursuit which lasted for four hours. The Sikhs began gradually retreating into rougher territory filled with Muslim villagers who mainly supported the British against the Sikhs. The Sikh loss was estimated at between 3,000 and 5,000 men and 53 guns; the British casualties were 96 killed and 700 wounded.

On 12 March, Chattar Singh and Sher Singh surrendered to Sir Walter Gilbert near Rawalpindi. Some 20,000 men (mainly irregular cavalry) laid down their arms. The Afghan contingent hastily withdrew through Attock and Peshawar, which the British reoccupied. Dost Mohammad Khan later signed a treaty acknowledging British possession of these cities. The British had also gained control of the Khyber Pass which became the westernmost boundary of the British Raj. British rule was largely welcomed by the local Muslim population which had detested the rule of the Sikh Empire. This was also due to the fact that the British reallowed the Muslim call of prayer to go on which had been banned under the Sikhs.

== War photography ==
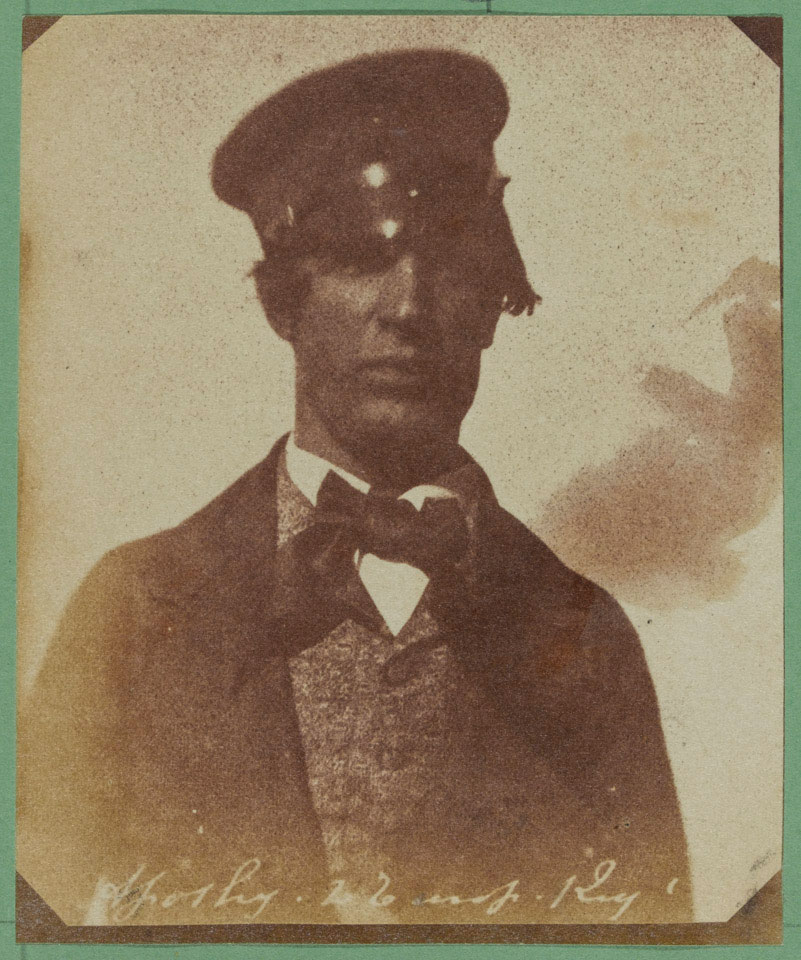
Apothecary of the 2nd Bombay European Regiment during the Second Anglo-Sikh War, by John McCosh, 1849.

John McCosh, a surgeon in the Bengal Army, is considered by some historians to be the first war photographer known by name. He produced a series of photographs documenting the Second Anglo-Sikh War. These consisted of portraits of fellow officers, key figures from the campaigns, administrators and their wives and daughters, including Patrick Alexander Vans Agnew, Generals Gough and Napier, and Dewan Mulraj of Multan. He also photographed local people and architecture, artillery emplacements and the destructive aftermath.

== Aftermath ==
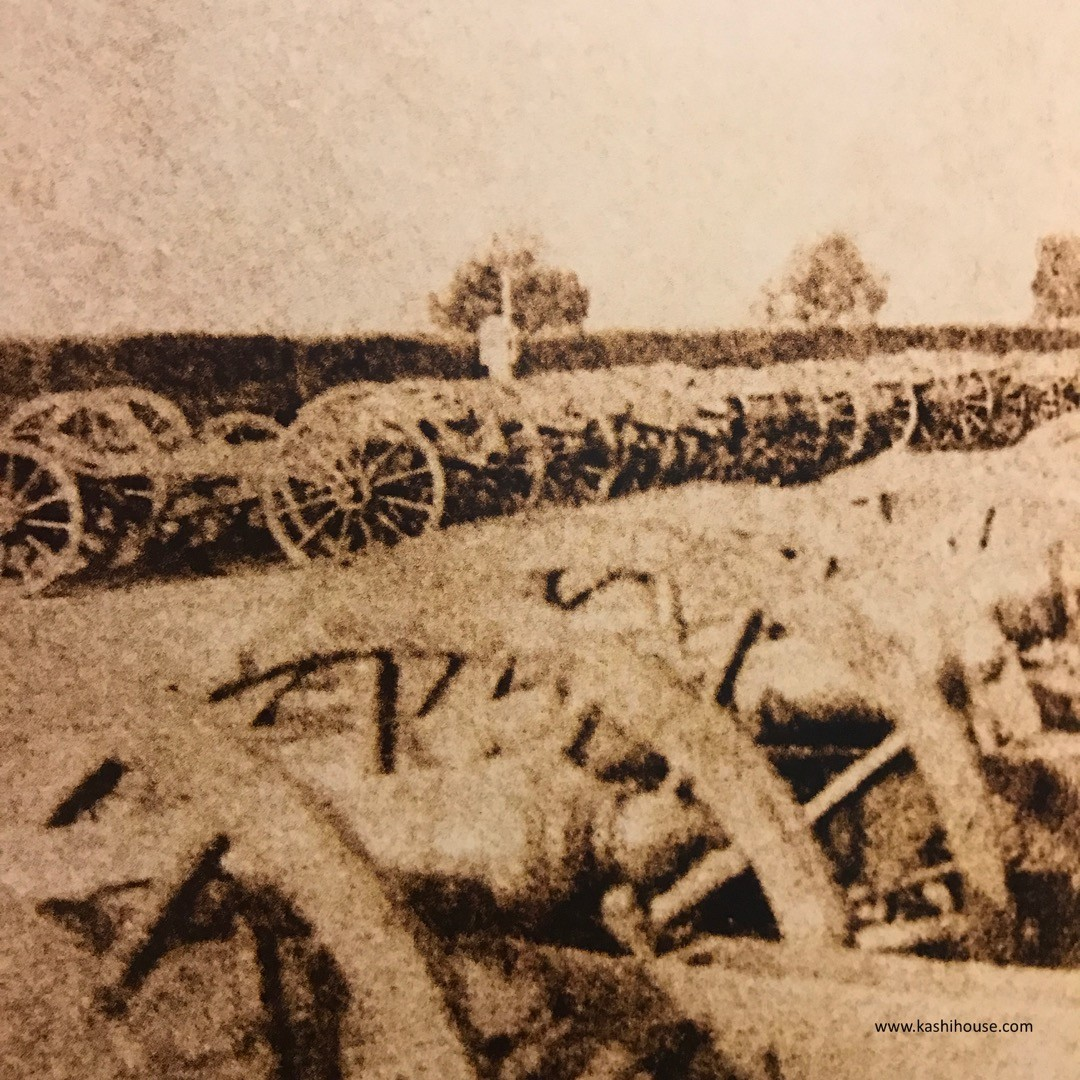
Photograph of captured Sikh guns parked in Ambala cantonment in the aftermath of the Second Anglo-Sikh War, by John McCosh, circa April 1849

Lord Dalhousie proclaimed Britain's annexation of the Punjab on 2 April 1849. His foreign secretary, Henry Meirs Elliot, arrived at Lahore to obtain the signatures of the members of the Council of Regency and Duleep Singh. A durbar was held in the Lahore Fort where Singh affixed his signatures to the document which confirmed the annexation. The Sikh defeat had several causes. Their administration of the population of the Punjab had been poor, which meant that their large armies found it difficult to find enough food while the East India Company had brought overwhelming force against them. After the Second Anglo-Sikh War of 1848–49, the areas of the following districts were annexed by the Britishers: Amritsar, Gurdaspur, Rohtak, Bannu, Dera Ghazi Khan, Dera Ismail Khan, Gujranwala, Gujrat, Hazara, Jhang, Jhelum, Kohat, Lahore, Montgomerty, Multan, Muzaffargarh, Peshawar, Rawalpindi, Shahpur, and Sialkot districts.

The Anglo-Sikh wars gave the two sides a mutual respect for each other's fighting prowess (although the war itself had been unchivalrously fought; the Sikhs took no prisoners at Chillianwala, and the British had taken no prisoners at Gujrat). There was an increased recruitment of people from various communities of the Punjab in the Punjab Irregular Force under British command. These recruits fought for the East India Company during the Indian Rebellion of 1857, against the mutineers and other opponents (mostly high-caste Hindus from Eastern provinces, and forces or loyalists of Shia, Maratha and Mughal rulers). These Punjabi recruits had especially little sympathy with the Hindu mutineers of the Bengal Army, ironically contributed to by the latter's role in helping the British in the Anglo-Sikh wars. A long history of enmity of the Sikhs with Mughal rule did not help the mutineers' cause either, given their choice of Bahadur Shah Zafar as a symbolic leader.

== Holdouts ==
After the war, some holdout resistance was carried out by Bhai Maharaj Singh, Colonel Rachpal Singh, and Narain Singh who travelled around rural areas to turn the peasants against foreigners. The British placed bounties on them, dead or alive. All conspirators eventually were all arrested or killed by the police. Narain Singh was captured alive and Colonel Rachpal Singh was fatally wounded near Aligarh. Bhai Maharaj Singh had a 10,000 rupee bounty on his capture or death but was arrested on 28 December 1849 along with 21 followers. He would later be sentenced to imprisonment in Singapore, where he died.

== Battle honour ==
The battle honour "Punjaub" was distributed with a free hand to all regiments employed in the operations of the Anglo-Sikh Wars during 1848–49 vide Gazette of the Governor General 277 of 1849, and the list of regiments honoured was issued vide. GoGG 803 of 1853. The Bombay Army was awarded separately and the spelling was changed from 'Punjaub' to 'Punjab' vide Gazette of India No. 1079 of 1910. Forty of the honoured units of the Bengal Army were consumed by the Mutiny. India has now raised a memorial at Ferozepore to pay homage to men of the Sikh Khalsa Army who laid down their lives in the Anglo-Sikh Wars and the battle honour is considered to be repugnant.

== Notes ==
Preceded by First Anglo-Sikh War	Indo–British conflicts	Succeeded by Indian Rebellion of 1857
