= Herbert Benjamin Edwardes =

British Soldier and Statesman in Punjab region (1819–1868)

Major General Sir Herbert Benjamin Edwardes
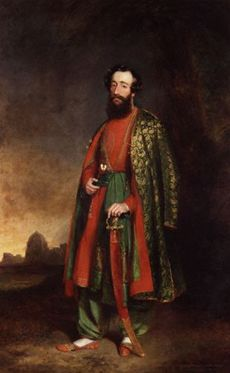
- Major Herbert Benjamin Edwardes, CB, DCL (1819–1868), The Hero of Multan, dressed as an Indian nobleman, by Henry Moseley, c.1850. National Portrait Gallery, London, (NPG 1391)
- Born: 12 November 1819; Frodesley, Shropshire, United Kingdom
- Died: 23 December 1868 (aged 49); London, United Kingdom
- Burial place: Highgate Cemetery
- Military career
- Allegiance: East India Company; British India
- Branch: Bengal Army
- Service years: 1842–1868
- Rank: Major-General
- Nickname: Hero of Multan
- Unit: 1st Bengal European Regiment
- Conflicts: First Anglo-Sikh War; Second Anglo-Sikh War; Indian Mutiny
- Awards: Knight Commander of the Order of the Bath; Knight Commander of the Star of India; Doctor of Civil Law
- Other work: Commissioner of Ambala (1862–1865)

Major-General Sir Herbert Benjamin Edwardes KCB KCSI DCL (12 November 1819 – 23 December 1868) was a British administrator, soldier, and statesman active in the Punjab region of British India. He is best known as the "Hero of Multan" for his pivotal role in securing British victory in the Second Anglo-Sikh War.

== Background and early life ==
Edwardes was born at Frodesley in Shropshire on 12 November 1819, the 2nd son of the Rev. Benjamin Edwardes (1790/1-1823), rector of Frodesley, a younger son of Sir John Thomas Cholmondeley Edwardes, 8th Baronet, of Shrewsbury (1764–1816). The Edwardes Baronetcy of Shropshire had been conferred on his ancestor Sir Thomas Edwardes by King Charles I in 1644/5.The baronetcy eventually became dormant on the death of the 10th Baronet Sir Henry Hope Edwardes to extant with Edwardes-Iddon which Edwardes are descended claiming succession to the title.

Edwardes's mother died during his infancy, and from the age of four, following his father's death in 1823, he was brought up in the household of a deeply religious aunt, from whom he developed his own strongly Protestant Christian faith. At the age of ten, he was sent to a boarding school at Richmond, Surrey, where he did not early distinguish himself. He went on to study Classics and Mathematics at King's College, London, and developed there a great interest in modern literature, composing poetry and drawing. He played a prominent role in the debating society.

== Early service in India ==
Having been prevented from going up to Oxford by pressure from his guardians, Edwardes determined himself on a career in India. He applied directly to Sir Richard Jenkins, of Bicton Hall, Salop, a deputy chairman of the East India Company, formerly of the Bombay Civil Service, Member of Parliament for Shrewsbury in 1837, and family friend, for a cadetship in the Bengal Infantry. He landed at Calcutta early in 1841, aged 22, and from July 1842 served as a Second Lieutenant in the 1st Bengal European Regiment, first at Dinapore and then at Karnal, a frontier station. He remained with this regiment about five years, during which time he obtained a good knowledge of the Hindustani, Urdu and Persian languages, passing exams in all 3 subjects, which qualified him for the position of interpreter, which he obtained in November 1845, aged 26. He developed a deep understanding of military, political and social affairs in India, which showed itself in his many literary contributions to the Delhi Gazette entitled "Brahminee Bull's letters to his Cousin John Bull", expressing bold political opinions often critical of British Indian policy. His essays became well-read throughout British India and particularly impressed the Commander-in-Chief of the Indian Army himself, Sir Hugh Gough, who appointed Edwardes a member of his personal staff.

== First Anglo-Sikh War ==
Edwardes served as aide-de-camp to Gough during the First Anglo-Sikh War and fought at Mudki on 18 December 1845, where he was wounded, and at the final bloody rout of the Sikhs at Sobraon on 10 February 1846. Following the British victory, the Punjab came to be ruled by a British Resident seated at the historic capital of Lahore, supported by a Regency Council acting for the infant Maharaja Duleep Singh. In 1846, aged 27, Edwardes was appointed by the new British Resident Sir Henry Lawrence, as Assistant Resident. After three months at Lahore he was posted to the court of the Maharaja of Jammu, recently established by the British as ruler of Kashmir, divested from Punjab territorial lands following the Treaty of Lahore in 1846. Here he helped to suppress a local rebellion against the Maharaja, Gulab Singh.

== Founding of Edwardesabad ==
In February 1847, aged 28, Edwardes was detached on special duty as Political Agent to the remote trans-Indus district of Bannu, where he was to improve the district's tax-revenue yield to Lahore, much lessened of late by evasion and non-payment. Here backed by a small force of Sikh troops, but largely on the strength of his own personality, he completely reformed the administration. He settled local feuds and demolished local fortresses, built roads and canals and encouraged agriculture. The town established by him was named after his death in his honour Edwardesabad, a name which gave way after independence to Bannu, unlike the surviving name of Abbottabad, which commemorates Edwardes's contemporary, General Sir James Abbott - it was Edwardes himself who named Abbottabad after James Abbott.

== Second Anglo-Sikh War ==
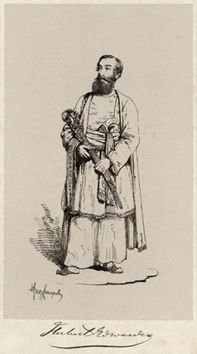
Sir Herbert Benjamin Edwardes by Alfred Crowquill, c.1850. Etching, National Portrait Gallery, London (NPG D36073)

The events and disturbances which grew into the Second Anglo-Sikh War of 1848–49 started at Multan, in southern Punjab, under the governorship of Dewan Mulraj, near which fortified town Edwardes found himself at the time, devoid of military support. Sensing that time was of the essence to prevent the rebellion spreading rapidly to the whole of the Punjab, and having no senior officer to consult, Edwardes made his response at first on his own initiative. He immediately raised a body of Pathan Irregulars and on 18 June 1848, having been joined by a force of Sikh troops, at Kineyri he routed a rebel force loyal to Dewan Mulraj. Subsequently, on 3 July, with reinforcements from his neighbouring District Officer Lieutenant Lake, and with troops sent by the Nawab of Bahawalpur from south of Multan, he defeated the rebels a second time at Sadusam, near Multan. Here he permanently injured his right hand in an accident with his pistol. Edwardes then forced the rebels to retreat to the fort of Multan, where they remained contained until the arrival of General William Sampson Whish and the Bombay column, whereupon, assisted by the further action of Edwardes's force, a siege was established. On 22 January 1849 Dewan Mulraj surrendered, following negotiations directed by Edwardes. Sir Henry Lawrence praised Edwardes's pivotal role in the war, stating that "Since the days of Clive no man had done as Edwardes". All had been achieved by personal initiative, without formal military training. He was commended by Gough and the Government, promoted brevet major in September 1848 and made a Companion of the Order of the Bath (CB), in October 1849. The East India Company awarded him a specially struck gold medal for services in the Punjab.

He returned to a hero's welcome in England and Shropshire, was thanked by both Houses of Parliament and on 12 June 1850 was awarded the degree of Doctor of Civil Law (DCL) by Oxford University. He was entertained at civic banquets in London and Liverpool, and made many well-received public speeches. While in England, on 9 July 1850, aged 31, he married Emma Sidney, daughter of James Sidney of Richmond, Surrey. It was most probably at this time his portrait was painted by Henry Moseley, showing him dressed as an Indian nobleman, which was presented by his widow in 1905 to the National Portrait Gallery. He published in 1851 an account in 2 volumes of his experiences during the war entitled A Year on the Punjab Frontier.

== Treaty with Afghanistan ==
Edwardes believed that the security of British India against the designs of Russia would be improved on the North-Western Frontier by the existence of a strong and independent Afghanistan and he urged the signing of a British Treaty of Friendship with the Amir Dost Mohammad Khan. Although opposed by Sir John Lawrence, then Chief Commissioner of the Punjab, as the new ruling magistrate was known following the 1849 British annexation of Punjab, Edwardes's suggestion received the approval of the Governor General of India Lord Dalhousie. The treaty was signed by Lawrence and the Amir on 30 March 1855. It contained a strict non-interference clause which turned out to be vital in maintaining calm in the Punjab during the Indian Rebellion of 1857 2 years later, thus allowing Punjab troops to be sent away to assist in the relief of Delhi and in subsequent operations. A second treaty was signed in January 1857.

== Indian Rebellion of 1857 ==
On the outbreak of the Indian Rebellion of 1857 at far away Meerut and Delhi, Edwardes received the sanction of Sir John Lawrence, the successor in the chief magistracy of the Punjab to his elder brother Sir Henry Lawrence, to raise native troops in the Punjab to form a moveable column to maintain order in the Punjab. Lawrence later sent the large part of these troops and other units previously raised by his brother and new units raised by himself to assist in the Siege of Delhi. It was this decisive action of Sir John Lawrence's, in taking the risk to leave the Punjab undefended, a policy opposed by Edwardes, which earned for him the sobriquet "The Saviour of India".

== Interlude in England ==
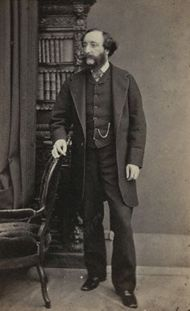
Sir Herbert Benjamin Edwardes by William Edward Kilburn. Carte-de-Visite, 1860s. National Portrait Gallery, London (NPG x45342)

Aged 40, in mid-1859 Edwardes once more returned to England, his health so greatly impaired by the continual strain of arduous work that it was doubtful whether he could ever return to India. During his stay he was created KCB, with the rank of brevet colonel; and the degree of LL.D. was conferred upon him by the University of Cambridge. In 1860, he was invited to speak at the Wenlock Olympian Games, when he praised their founder William Penny Brookes and the local Olympian Society's work but showed disagreement with the Greek influence of the name by publicly suggesting the games be called "'The Shropshire Class of British Work and Play', or anything else you will; but let it tell of English men and women."

== Commissioner of Ambala ==
Early in 1862, aged 43, with improved health he again returned to the Punjab, and was appointed to the prestigious Commissionership of Ambala and as agent for the Cis-Sutlej states. After he had held the posts for 3 years, the health of both him and his wife deteriorated and on 1 January 1865, aged 46, he left British India for the last time.

== Later life and death ==
Following his final return to England he was made Knight Commander of the Star of India (KCSI) on 24 May 1866 and promoted Major-General on 22 February 1868. He received a "good conduct" pension of £100.

He had been engaged for some time on writing a biography of his old chief Sir Henry Lawrence, and high expectations were held for the work, which he did not, however, live to complete, which task was performed by Herman Merivale. He suffered a bad attack of pleurisy in March 1868 from which he temporarily recovered, upon which he was offered the post of Lieutenant-Governor of the Punjab in March 1868. His recovery however relapsed and he died in London on 23 December 1868, aged 49, after a severe haemorrhage.

He was buried in the Meadow on the western side of Highgate Cemetery and is commemorated by a mural tablet in Westminster Abbey and a stained glass window in the chapel of King's College London.

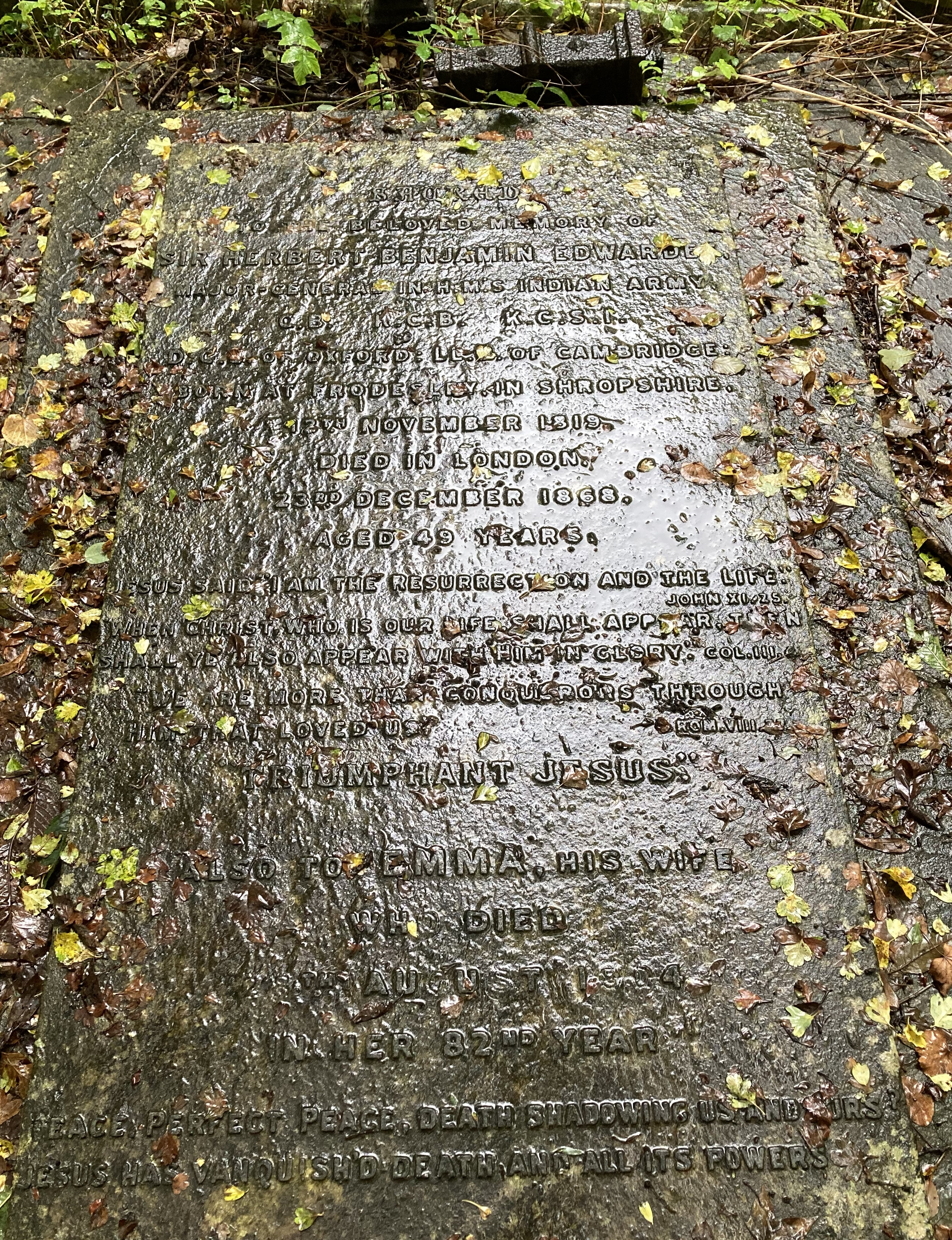
Grave of Herbert Benjamin Edwardes in Highgate Cemetery

He was survived by his wife, Emma (née Sydney), whom he had married in 1850.

== Christian Evangelism ==
Edwardes was a devout Christian of the Protestant anti-ritualist variety. A contemporary point of contention on his career could be stated to be his propensity to evangelise amongst the indigenous populations of India.

After the Indian Rebellion of 1857–8, caused in some measure by the sepoys' belief that their ancient religions were under attack with the sanction of the British-Indian regime, he continued, on his return to India in 1862, to enthusiastically urge the Government of India to publicly support the propagation of Christianity in India. Reputable biographers have gone so far as to call this attitude of his "a considerable lack of common sense",. He shared his strong evangelical Christian attitudes with his brother officer and close friend Brigadier-General John Nicholson. During his final period in England, he served as vice-president of the Church Missionary Society.

On 19 December 1853, a meeting was arranged under the Commissioner of Peshawar, Sir Herbert Edwardes, to discuss a Christian Mission to the city. The very first school in the province was established in 1853 by one of the first missionaries, Robert Clarke, under the patronage of Edwardes, today the High School, Kohati Gate Peshawar, Pakistan.

== Literary works ==
- A Year on the Punjab Frontier, 2 vols., 1851.
- Political Diaries of Lieut. H. B. Edwardes, Assistant to the Resident at Lahore 1847 – 1849, Sang-e-Meel Publications, Lahore, Pakistan 2006 (Reprint version) ISBN 969-35-1770-9

== Commemorations ==
- Edwardes College, Peshawar, North West Frontier Province (NWFP), Pakistan.
- Edwardesabad (now Bannu), NWFP, Pakistan.
- Edwardes High School kohati gate Peshawar Pakistan.(S.Qaisar Kazmi)

== Sources ==
- Moreman, T. R. "Edwardes, Sir Herbert Benjamin". Oxford Dictionary of National Biography (online ed.). Oxford University Press. doi:10.1093/ref:odnb/8528. (Subscription, Wikipedia Library access or UK public library membership required.)
- Stephen, Leslie, ed. (1889). "Edwardes, Herbert Benjamin" . Dictionary of National Biography. Vol. 17. London: Smith, Elder & Co.
