= Lord Lawrence =

Lord Lawrence may refer to:

- Baron Lawrence, a hereditary title that was created in 1863 and became extinct in 2023
  - John Lawrence, 1st Baron Lawrence (1811–1879), Viceroy of India from 1864 to 1869
  - John Lawrence, 2nd Baron Lawrence (1846–1913), British Conservative politician
- Charles Lawrence, 1st Baron Lawrence of Kingsgate (1855–1927), British politician and railway executive

== See also ==
- Baron Trevethin and Oaksey, surnamed Lawrence
- Doreen Lawrence, Baroness Lawrence of Clarendon (born 1952), British-Jamaican campaigner
