= Maude Lawrence =

British civil servant (1864–1933)

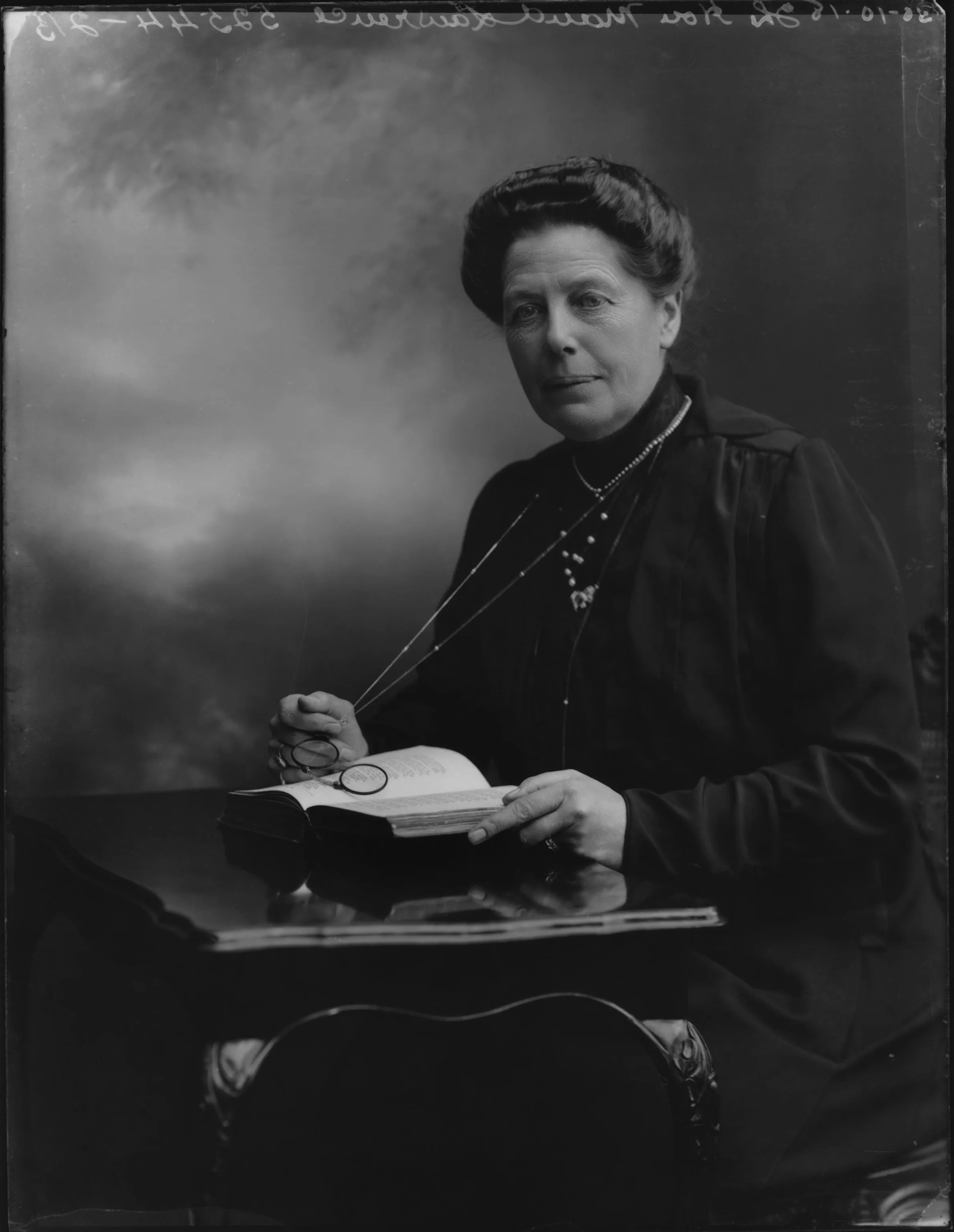
Lawrence in 1918

Dame Maude Agnes Lawrence DBE (16 April 1864 – 11 January 1933) was a British civil servant who was among the first women to serve in HM Government. She was appointed the first Chief Woman Inspector of the Board of Education in 1905.

== Early life ==
Lawrence was born in Southgate, London, the daughter of John Lawrence, 1st Baron Lawrence, Viceroy of India 1864–1869, and Harriette Katherine Hamilton of County Meath, Ireland. She was the niece of General Sir Henry Lawrence and Lieutenant-General Sir George Lawrence, and sister of John Lawrence, 2nd Baron Lawrence, rugby player Henry Lawrence, businessman Charles Lawrence, 1st Baron Lawrence of Kingsgate, and General Sir Herbert Lawrence.

She was educated at Bedford College.

== Career ==
From 1899 to 1904, Lawrence was a member of the London School Board serving on committees for Domestic Subjects, School Management, School Accommodation, and Works. In 1905, the Marquess of Londonderry, President of the Board of Education appointed Lawrence to serve as the first Chief Woman Inspector under the Board of Education, overseeing a team of female inspectors. Prior to this, a small team of female inspectors inspected elementary schools working under male management. The all-female team was tasked with ensuring welfare and curriculum standards were being met for young children, girls, and women, from elementary schools to technical schools. The female inspectors were also tasked with ensuring women attending training colleges had satisfactory room and board.

Additionally, Lawrence's new role was created following a troubling report from the Inter-Departmental Committee on Physical Deterioration, also known as the Fitzroy Report. Reported The Times in 1905:

There are also many questions of importance involving the national physique, as affected by the studies, the life, and the treatment of children, and especially of very young children, from day to day in elementary schools, which women inspectors are specially qualified to investigate and to advise upon. The Board feel that it is of great importance to direct the attention of local authorities to these matters, and that this service will be most efficiently rendered by a competent staff of women inspectors.

— The Times, 2 February 1905

In her obituary, The Times reported that Lawrence declined to be known as an educationist, writing: "Her strength lay in her character — her sound common sense, her honesty of purpose, and her courage, together with a remarkable power of dealing with people of all sorts. She at once gained the confidence both of the inspectors and of the Permanent Secretary and the office. And thus under her the building up of the women's side of one branch after another of the Board's inspectorate soon became a natural process, welcome both to the Board and to the local authorities and the schools."

In 1920, Lawrence was again pointed to a new role, that of Director of Women's Establishments at HM Treasury, to advise the Treasury on all issues which could affect female civil servants. She took special interest in the Civil Service Sports Council, organising the women's teams for field hockey, golf, and swimming. She regularly competed in golf tournaments as a member of the Denham Golf Club.

She was created a Dame Commander of the Order of the British Empire in the 1926 Birthday Honours.

She died at Ickenham Hall, Uxbridge, following a short illness, at age 68.
