= Kingsgate Castle =

Mock castle in Kingsgate, Kent, England

Coordinates: 51°22′59″N 1°26′36″E

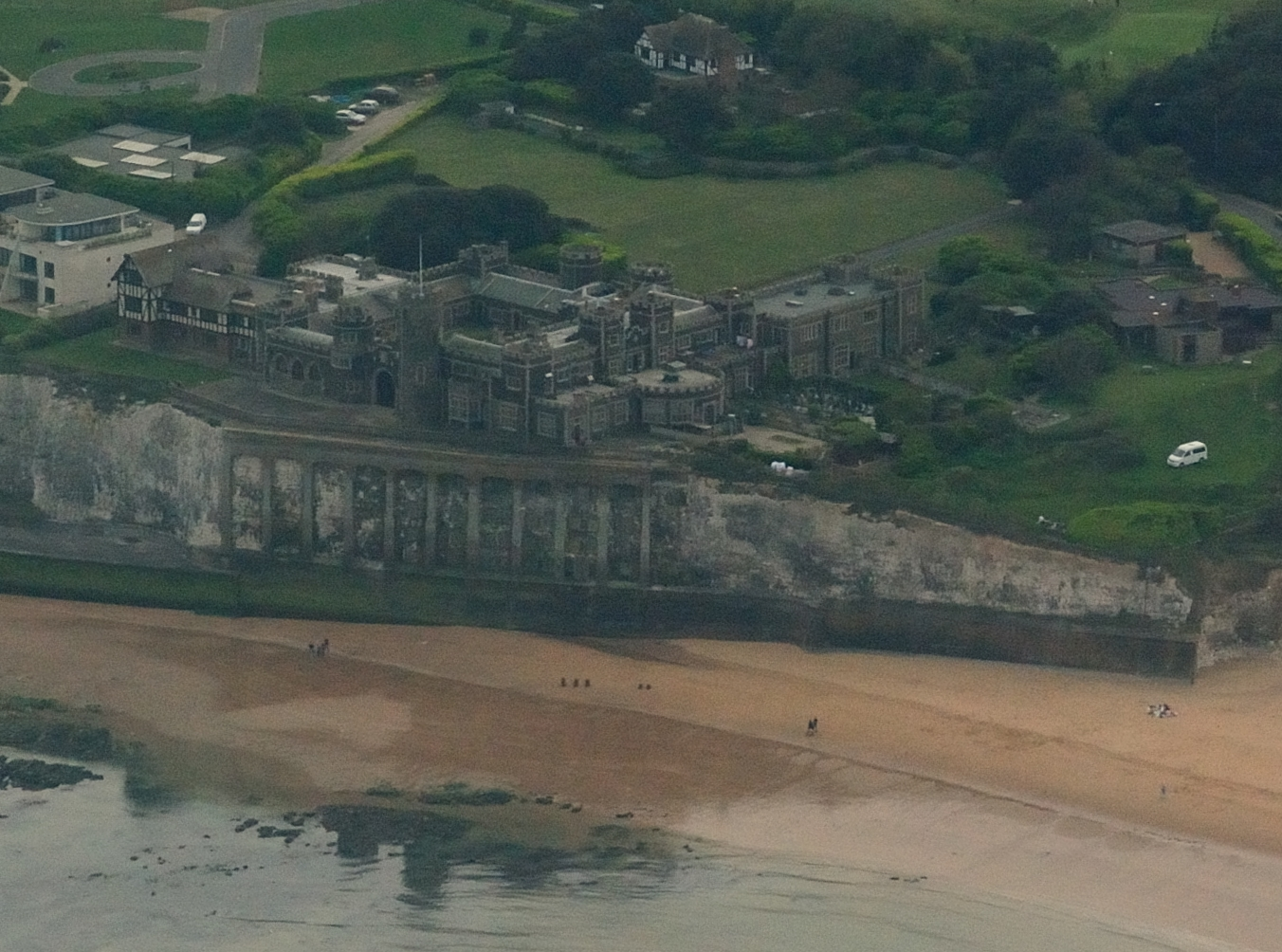
- Aerial photograph of Kingsgate Castle

General information
- Year built: 1760s
- Client: Henry Fox, 1st Baron Holland

Listed Building – Grade II
- Official name: Kingsgate Castle
- Designated: 20 September 1974
- Reference no.: 1239636

Kingsgate Castle is a mock castle on the cliffs above Kingsgate Bay, Broadstairs, Kent, England.

== History ==
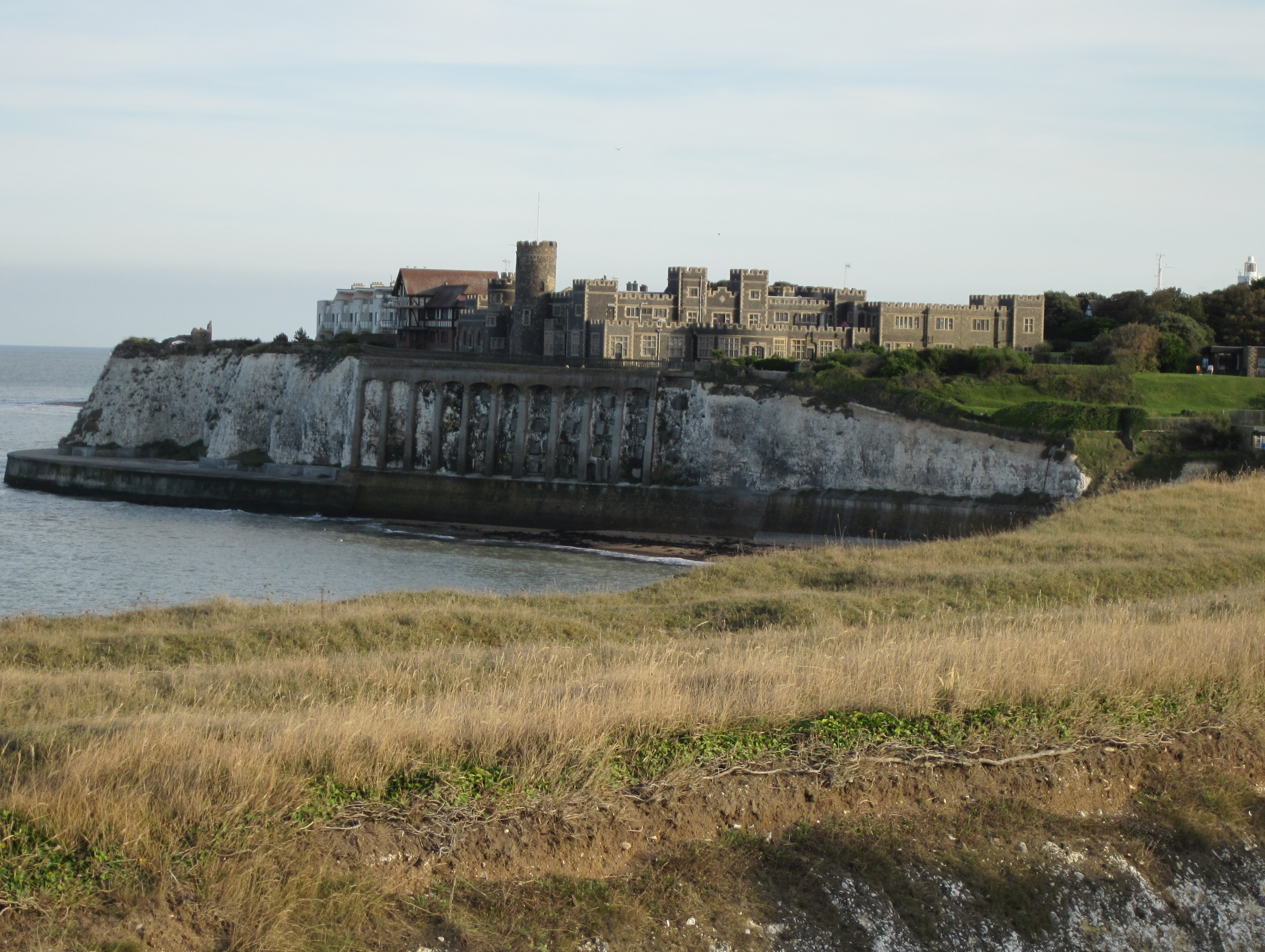
Kingsgate Castle looking across Kingsgate Bay. The North Foreland lighthouse is just visible on the right of the photo.

Kingsgate Castle was built for Lord Holland (Henry Fox, 1st Baron Holland) in the 1760s as the stable block of his nearby country residence Holland House. His main residence was Holland House in Kensington, near London. The name Kingsgate is related to an incidental landing of Charles II on 30 June 1683 (‘gate’ referring to a cliff gap) though other English monarchs have also used this cove, such as George II in 1748. The building soon fell in to ruin after construction and the large round tower is the only remaining original structure. The building was later the residence of John Lubbock, 1st Baron Avebury. It was sold by Lady Avebury in 1922, the castle became a fashionable hotel, and was then converted into 32 private flats in 1954.

== Gallery ==
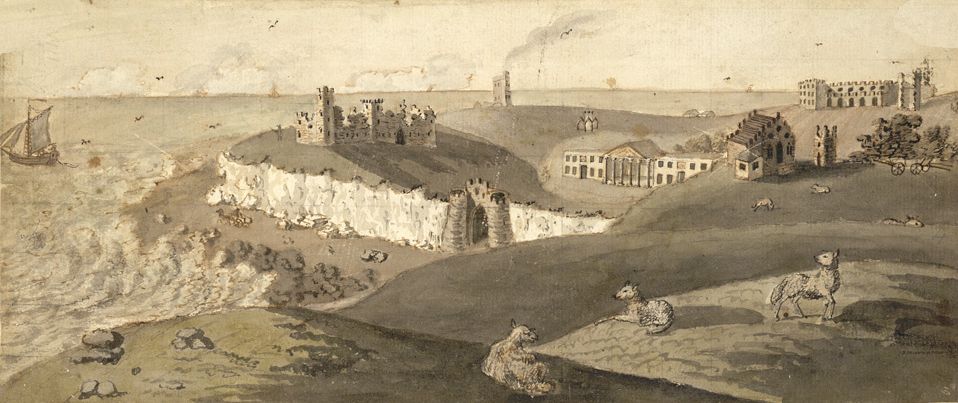
Kingsgate Castle and bay, 18th century

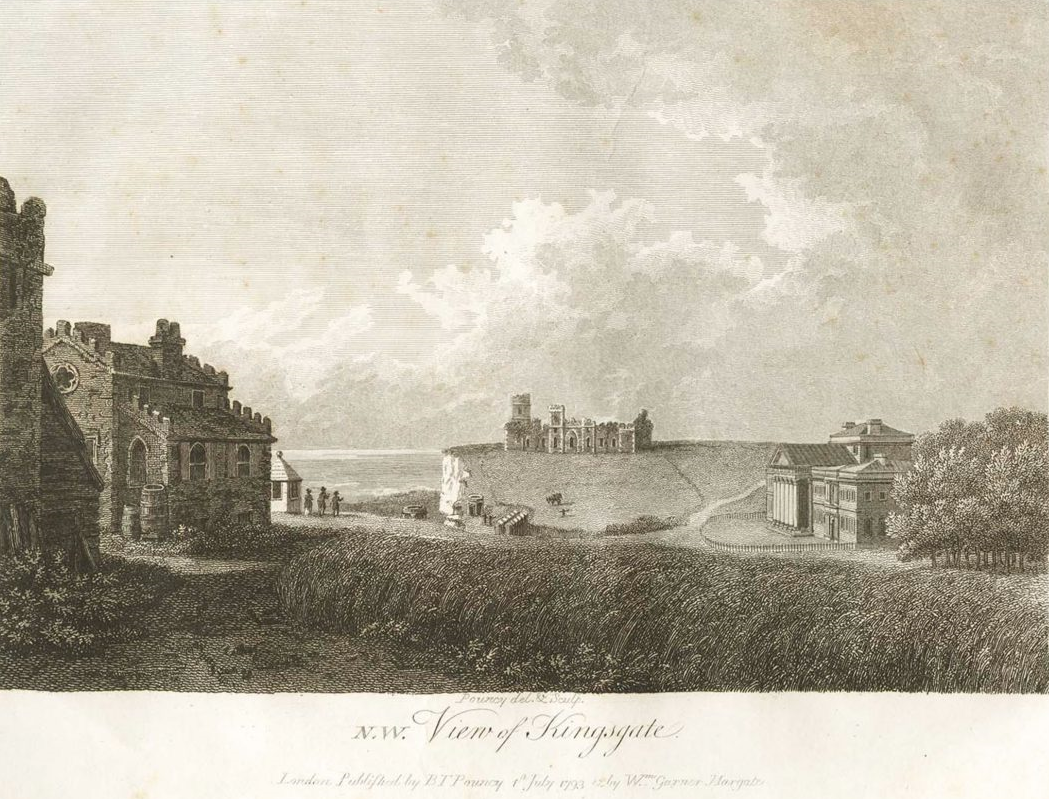
A Benjamin Thomas Pouncy engraving of Kinsgate with the castle in the background, dated 1793

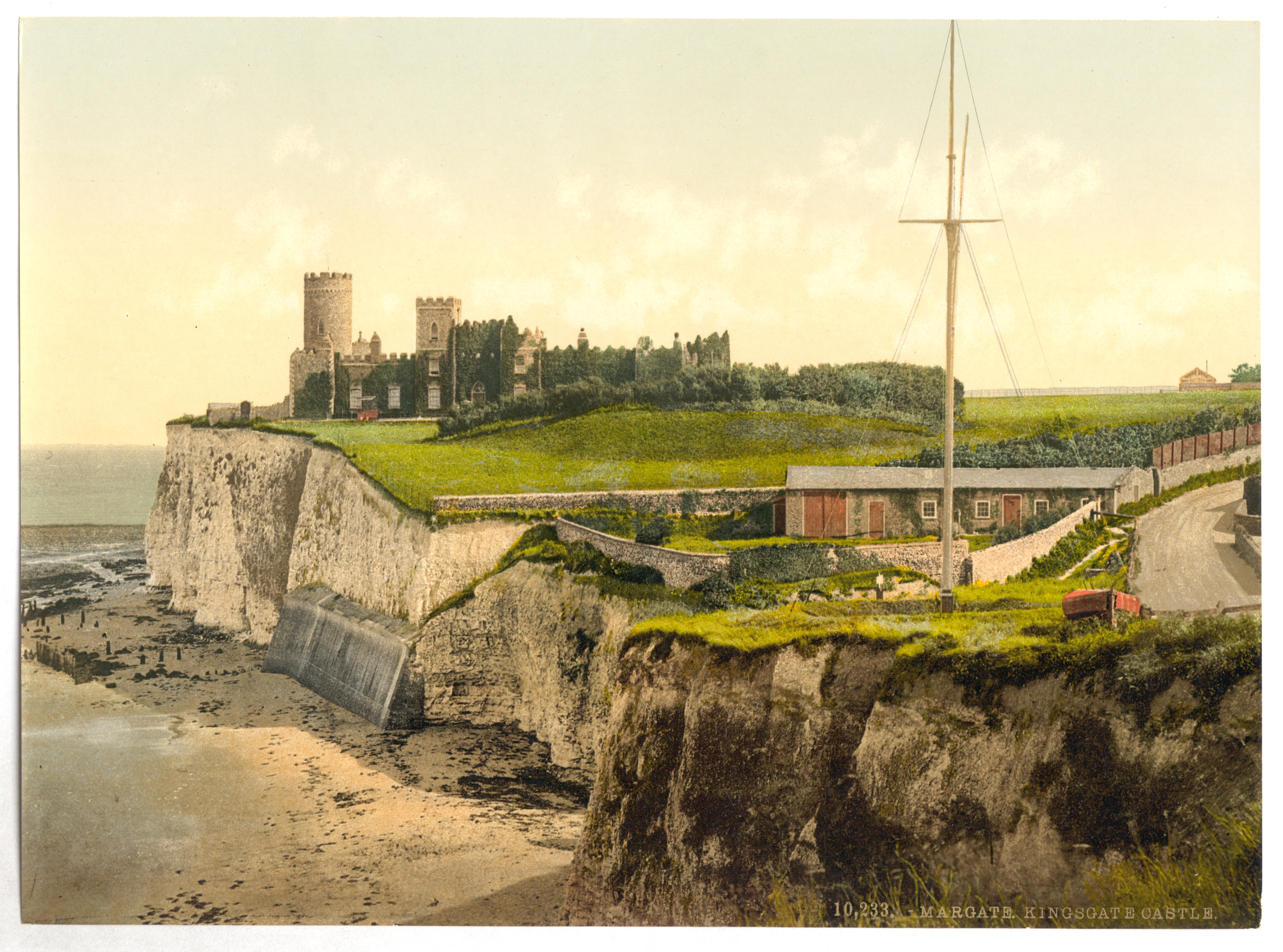
A painting of Kingsgate Castle and the bay, dated between 1890 and 1900

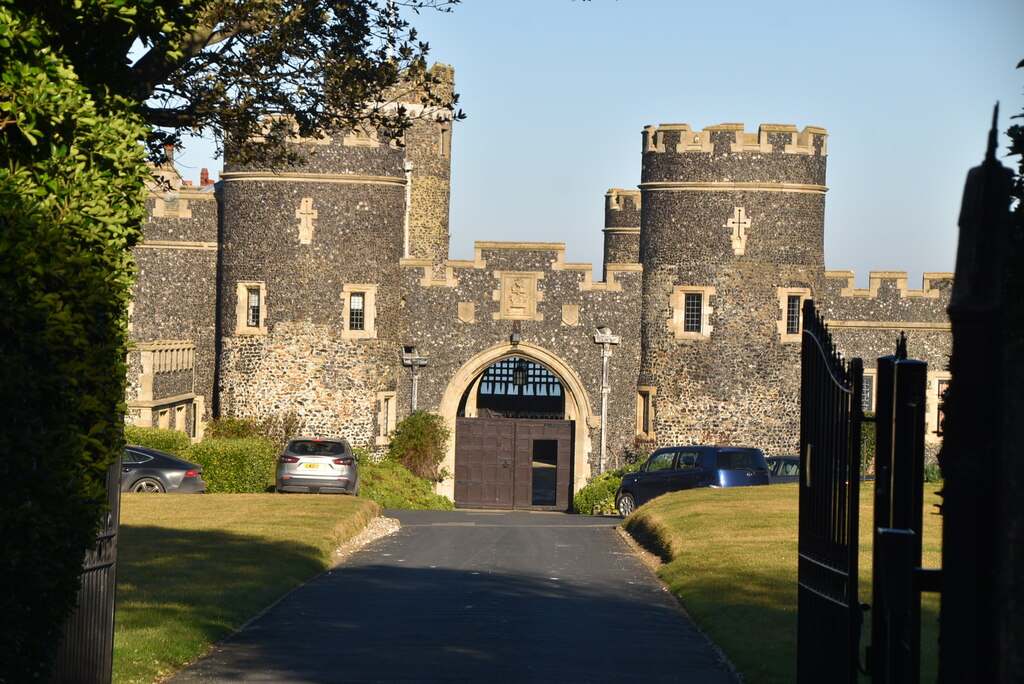
Entrance to the grounds
