= Holland House, Kingsgate =

Country house in Kent, England

Coordinates: 51°23′01″N 1°26′30″E

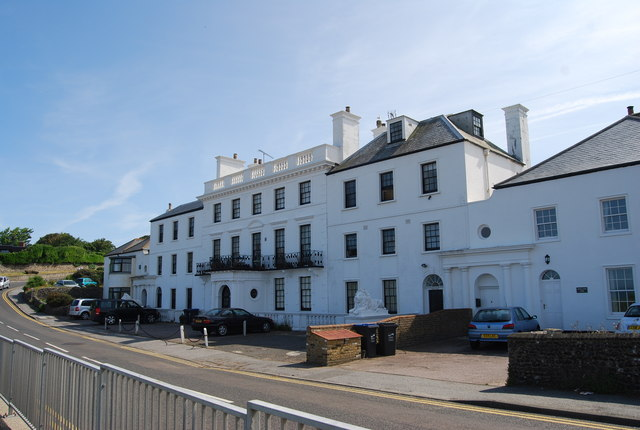
Holland House, Kingsgate, in 2009

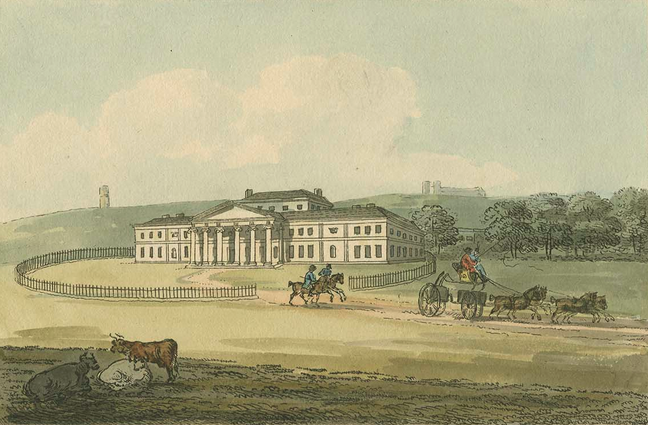
"Lord Holland's House, Kingsgate", 1797 engraving by Amelia Noel

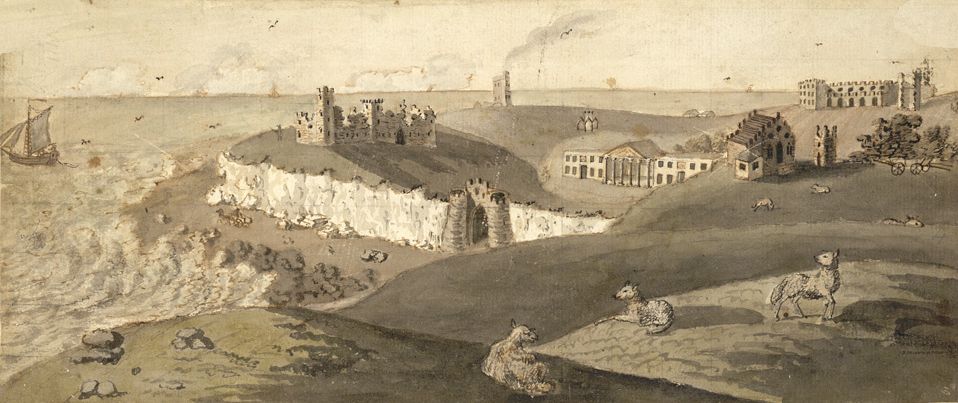
Holland House, Kingsgate, with surrounding follies, 18th century drawing

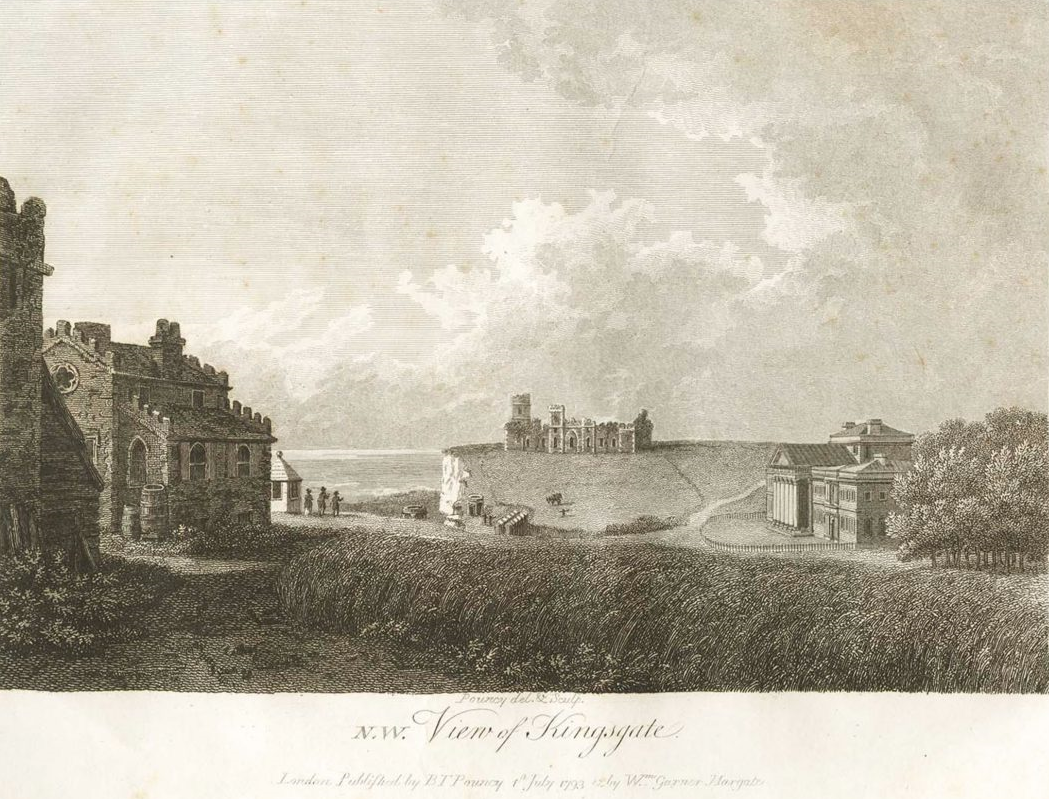
Holland House in 1793 (right), with follies at left Captain Digby public house and in far distance Kingsgate Castle. The top of The King's Gate is visible at left leading down to the beach

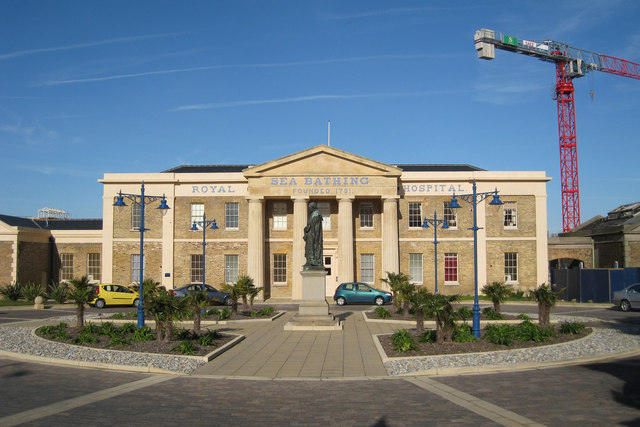
Royal Sea Bathing Hospital, Margate, the columns of the portico of which are believed to have been removed from Holland House, Kingsgate in 1853

Holland House is a Georgian country house, in Kingsgate, Kent in England. It was built between 1762 and 1768 by the politician Henry Fox, 1st Baron Holland (1705–1774), of Holland House in Kensington, as his retirement home. It is a Grade II listed building.

== Location and construction ==
The house overlooks the sea at Kingsgate Bay. It was designed by the amateur architect Thomas Wynn, 1st Baron Newborough and said to have been inspired by Cicero's villa at Formiae on the coast of Baiae. The architect Robert Adam was commissioned by Holland to design the interiors, but the work was not completed. (Note: A single 1767 design by Adam, for the ceiling of Lady Holland's bedroom, survives in the collection of Sir John Soane's Museum in London.).

Holland built a number of follies, constructed using flint, in the environs of Holland House, which included:

- Kingsgate Castle, originally intended as stables; later rebuilt by John Lubbock, 1st Baron Avebury (1834–1913) as his family home
- The King's Gate, a mock defensive Gothic crenellated gateway with portcullis, built on the beach in a gap between the cliffs, with stairs leading up to the house. Originally named Bartholomew Gate, it was later renamed to the King's Gate to commemorate King Charles II's ship reputedly having had a forced landing there during a storm in 1683. It is now located in the grounds of Kingsgate Castle
- Arx Ruochim, a coastal fort above White Ness, built in the style of several erected by King Henry VIII and said to have replaced a fort built on the site by King Vortigern in 458 AD; it survives, but missing its tower
- Hackendown Tower, built by Lord Holland on a Saxon burial mound which he had excavated in 1765, which he supposed to mark the site of a battle between the Saxons and the Danes, the name of which is apparently a play on "hack 'em down"
- Countess Fort, possibly used as an ice house
- The Captain Digby public house, named after Lord Holland’s nephew Admiral Robert Digby
- Whitfield Tower, built by Lord Holland on the highest point in the locality, in memory of Robert Whitfield, from whom he purchased much of the estate.

Holland and his family used the estate for the shooting of partridges and the playing of cricket, and in 1767 Holland increased his land holdings by purchasing the nearby estate of Quex.

== Subsequent ownership ==
Following Holland's death his estates were inherited by his second surviving son, the Whig statesman Charles James Fox. Fox sold the estate, together with Quex, to John Powell (d.1783) of Birchington. Powell died without progeny, and his estates passed to his sister. Her eldest son Arthur Annesley Powell inherited the estate, which by that point had fallen into ruin. When he died in 1813 the estate passed to his younger brother John Powell Roberts (1769–1849).

It was subsequently acquired by the banker and archaeologist John Lubbock, 1st Baron Avebury (1834–1913), who rebuilt the house from its degraded condition and expanded it. The house's surviving façade dates from a remodelling circa 1850, during which the original central portico was removed to the Royal Sea Bathing Hospital at Margate. Its next owner was the businessman and railway executive Charles Lawrence (1855–1927), who in 1923 was elevated to the peerage as Baron Lawrence of Kingsgate.

The surviving parts of the original structure are known today as Old Holland House. In the 1990s the entire building was converted into flats.
