= Salary of Sir J. Lawrence Act 1864 =

Act of the Parliament of the United Kingdom

- Act of Parliament
- Parliament of the United Kingdom
- Long title: An Act to enable the Right Honourable Sir John Laird Mair Lawrence to receive the full Benefit of the Salary of Governor General of India, notwithstanding his being in receipt of an Annuity granted to him by the East India Company.
- Citation: 27 & 28 Vict. c. 2
- Territorial extent: United Kingdom

Dates
- Royal assent: 18 March 1864
- Commencement: 18 March 1864 (Note: The Acts of Parliament (Commencement) Act 1793.)
- Repealed: 11 August 1875
Other legislation
Repealed by	Statute Law Revision Act 1875

Status: Repealed

Text of statute as originally enacted

The Salary of Sir J. Lawrence Act 1864 (27 & 28 Vict. c. 2) was an act of the Parliament of the United Kingdom. The act allowed Sir John Laird Mair Lawrence to collect an annuity alongside his salary as Governor General of India. The act received royal assent on 18 March 1864.

== Passage ==
The act had its first reading on 9 February 1864 and received Royal Assent on the 18 March 1864.

== Provisions ==
The provisions of the act include:

- Making it legal for Sir John Laird Mair Lawrence to receive both an annuity from the East India Company and his full salary as Governor General of India (and so exempting him from a part of the Government of India Act 1833 (3 & 4 Will. 4. c. 85) which ensured the salaries of members of the Council of India, including the Governor General, were the "whole Profit or Advantage which the said Officers should enjoy during their Continuance").

== Subsequent developments ==
The whole act was repealed by section 1 of, and the schedule to, the Statute Law Revision Act 1875 (38 & 39 Vict. c. 66), which came into force on 11 August 1875.
