= Baron Lawrence =

Barony in the Peerage of the United Kingdom

Barony Lawrence
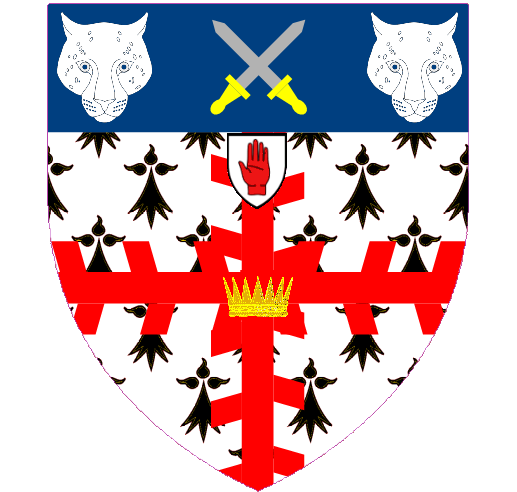
- Ermine, on a cross raguly gules an eastern crown or, on a chief azure two swords in saltire proper, pommels and hilts gold, between as many leopard's faces argent
- Creation date: 3 April 1869
- Created by: Queen Victoria
- Peerage: Peerage of the United Kingdom
- First holder: Sir John Lawrence, 1st Baronet
- Last holder: David Lawrence, 5th Baron Lawrence
- Remainder to: Heirs male of the first baron's body lawfully begotten
- Extinction date: 14 August 2023
- Motto: "Be Ready"

Baron Lawrence, of the Punjab and of Grateley in the County of Southampton, was a title in the Peerage of the United Kingdom. It was created in 1869 for Sir John Lawrence, 1st Baronet, the former Viceroy of India.

Lawrence had already been created a Baronet, in 1858. His son, the second Baron, served in the Conservative administrations of Lord Salisbury and Arthur Balfour as a government whip from 1895 to 1905. The title became extinct on the death of the fifth Baron on 14 August 2023.

Two other members of the Lawrence family may also be mentioned. Sir Henry Lawrence, a military officer and administrator in British India, was the elder brother of the first Baron Lawrence. Charles Lawrence, 1st Baron Lawrence of Kingsgate, was a younger son of the first Baron.

== Lawrence baronets, of the Army (1858) ==
- John Laird Mair Lawrence, 1st Baronet (1811–1879) (created Baron Lawrence in 1869)

=== Baron Lawrence (1869) ===
- John Laird Mair Lawrence, 1st Baron Lawrence (1811–1879)
- John Hamilton Lawrence, 2nd Baron Lawrence (1846–1913)
- Alexander Graham Lawrence, 3rd Baron Lawrence (1878–1947)
- John Anthony Edward Lawrence, 4th Baron Lawrence (1908–1968)
- David John Downer Lawrence, 5th Baron Lawrence (1937–2023)

=== Male-line family tree ===
Male-line family tree, Barons Lawrence

John Lawrence; 1st Baron Lawrence; 1811–1879
Baron Lawrence of Kingsgate
John Lawrence; 2nd Baron Lawrence; 1846–1913	Hon. Henry Lawrence; 1848–1902	Charles Lawrence; 1st Baron Lawrence of Kingsgate; 1855–1927	Gen. Sir; Herbert Lawrence; 1861–1943
Barony extinct
Unnamed son died in infancy	Alexander Lawrence; 3rd Baron Lawrence; 1878–1947	Unnamed son 1883–1883	John Lawrence; 1887–1900	Malcolm Lawrence; 1889–1915	Christopher Lawrence; 1893–1914	Oliver Lawrence; 1893–1915	Michael Lawrence; 1894–1916
John Lawrence; 4th Baron Lawrence; 1908–1968
David Lawrence; 5th Baron Lawrence; 1937–2023
Barony extinct
