= Amelia Noel =

British printmaker and publisher

- Born: Abinda, or Minka, Levy c.1759 London
- Died: 1818; London
- Occupation: artist
- Known for: landscapes
- Spouse: Henry Noah
- Children: four

Amelia Noel, born Abinda, or Minka, Levy and briefly Amelia Noah" (c.1759 – 1818) was a British printmaker, publisher and printer. She was an artist and a teacher of drawing. She exhibited in the Royal Academy in 1795 and she was the drawing teacher to the daughters of King George III and Queen Charlotte.

== Life ==
Noel was born in London when her name was Abinda, or Minka Levy. In 1781 she married Henry Noah who had been born with the name Zebe in the synagogue in Duke's Place. In time they would both use the name Noel. Her husband was a source of debt for both of them. He was bankrupt and she became responsible for his further financial shortfalls.

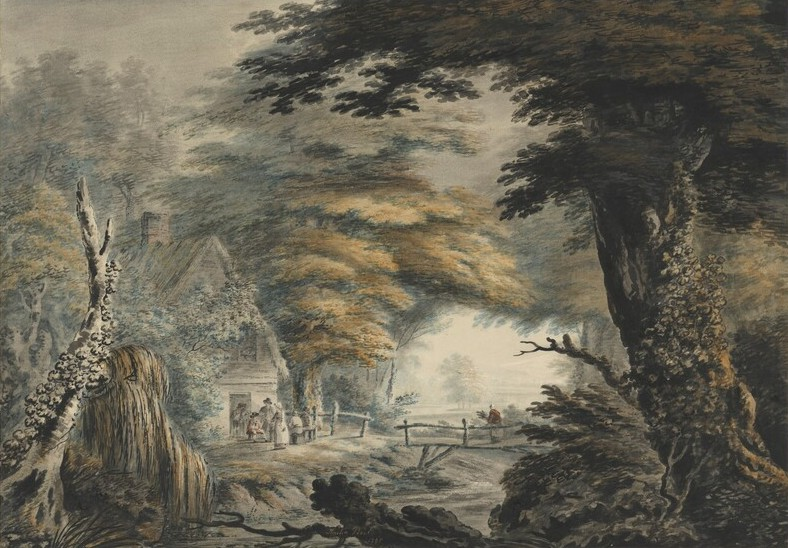
Wooded Landscape with Figures outside a Cottage by Amelia Noel - 1795

In 1790 her husband left and she was a mother with four children and a talent for art. On 5 April 1798 she lost a valuable collection and their belongings in a fire at their house. Other families were insured she was not. However the family were able to move to St James Place thanks to her supporters including Viscountess Palmerston. In 1805 she publishing a notice informing everyone that she had no relationship with her husband.

She became the drawing mistress to the daughters of King George III and Queen Charlotte. Their daughter Princess Sofia's drawing based on Noel's work are in the Royal Collection as are Noel's Views of Kent which were dedicated to Queen Charlotte.

In 1814 she was nearly blind and she was given a Royal pension of £40 a year by George III after her son died at the Battle of Lake Erie.

== Death and legacy ==
Noel died in Piccadilly in London in 1818. Her work is in the Royal Collection.
