= John Lawrence, 1st Baron Lawrence =

English British Imperial statesman from 1864 to 1869

The Right Honourable The Lord Lawrence Bt GCB GCSI PC
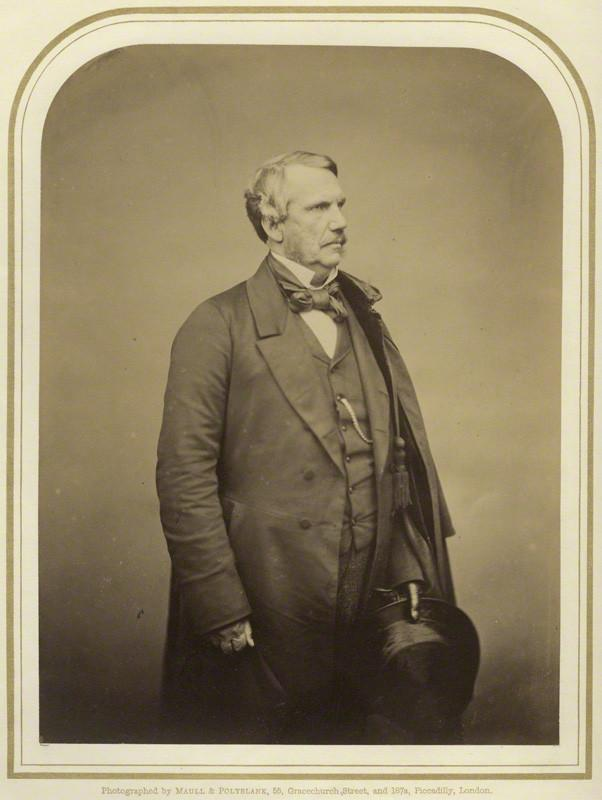
- The then Sir John Lawrence photographed by Maull & Polybank, c. 1850s

Viceroy and Governor-General of India
- In office 12 January 1864 – 12 January 1869
- Monarch: Queen Victoria
- Prime Minister: See list: The Viscount Palmerston The Earl Russell The Earl of Derby Benjamin Disraeli William Ewart Gladstone
- Preceded by: Sir William Denison; As Acting Viceroy and Governor-General
- Succeeded by: The Earl of Mayo

Lieutenant Governor of Punjab
- In office 1 January 1859 – 25 February 1859
- Governor General: The Earl Canning
- Preceded by: Office created
- Succeeded by: Sir Robert Montgomery

Chief Commissioner of Punjab
- In office 18 January 1853 – 31 December 1858
- Governors General: The Marquess of Dalhousie; The Earl Canning
- Preceded by: Office created
- Succeeded by: Office abolished

Personal details
- Born: 4 March 1811 Richmond, North Riding of Yorkshire, England
- Died: 27 June 1879 (aged 68) London, United Kingdom
- Spouse: Harriette Hamilton (m. 1841)
- Children: 10
- Education: East India Company College

John Laird Mair Lawrence, 1st Baron Lawrence, GCB GCSI PC (4 March 1811 – 27 June 1879), known as Sir John Lawrence, Bt., between 1858 and 1869, was a prominent British Imperial statesman and served as the Viceroy of India from 1864 to 1869.

== Early life ==
Lawrence was born in Richmond, North Riding of Yorkshire. He was the youngest son born into an Ulster-Scots family, his mother, Letitia Knox, being from County Donegal while his father was from Coleraine in County Londonderry. Lawrence spent his early years in Derry, a city in the Province of Ulster in the northern part of Ireland, and was educated at Foyle College and Wraxhall School in Bath. His father had served in India as a soldier in the British Army and his elder brothers included Sir George Lawrence and Sir Henry Lawrence.

At the age of sixteen, despite wishing for a military career like his brothers, his father enrolled him at the East India Company College, Haileybury, believing a career as a civil servant offered better prospects. He attended Haileybury for two years, where by his own admission he was neither very idle nor very industrious, yet he won prizes in history, political economy and Bengali.

== Passage to India ==
Lawrence entered the Bengal Civil Service and in September 1829 he set sail for India with his brother Henry. On arrival he settled at Fort William where he was expected to pass examinations in local vernacular. Having successfully mastered Persian and Urdu, Lawrence's first job was as a magistrate and tax collector in Delhi. After four years in Delhi he was transferred to Panipat and two years hence was placed in charge of Gurgaon district.

In 1837, Lawrence was made a settlement officer at Etawah. Whilst doing the role he caught jungle fever and was close to death. He spent three months in Calcutta to convalesce but having failed to recover he returned to England in 1840. The following year, whilst in County Donegal he met and married his wife Harriette in August 1841. The couple then spent six months travelling Europe until news from the First Anglo-Afghan War led to them returning to England, and back to India in the autumn of 1842.

On his return to India, Lawrence was appointed a Civil and Sessions Judge in Delhi, and given responsibility over Karnal. During the First Anglo-Sikh War between 1845 and 1846, Sir Henry Hardinge sent orders for Lawrence to assist the armed forces. He played a key role ahead of the Battle of Sobraon, ensuring supplies and guns were collected and transferred to the battle.

== Punjab ==
=== Jullundur and the Hill States ===
At the conclusion of the First Anglo-Sikh War, Hardinge appointed Lawrence to govern the newly-annexed Jullundur district and Hill States regions of the Punjab. In that role, Lawrence was known for his administrative reforms, his subduing the hill tribes and his attempts to end the custom of suttee. He attempted to tackle the issue of female infanticide by successfully threatening the Bedis with confiscation of their lands unless they gave up the practice. His assistant Robert Cust described Lawrence's interviews with native land-holders as follows:

"John Lawrence was full of energy – his coat off, his sleeves turned up above his elbows and impressing upon his subjects his principles of a just state demand...thou shall not burn thy widow, thou shall not kill thy daughters; thou shall not bury alive thy lepers."

Another assistant, Lewin Bowring, described how he had a rough tongue with the local chiefs, who had a wholesome dread of him. He was described as far abler than his brother at details but was not held in as much affection by the chiefs.

=== Board of Administration ===
Victory in the Second Anglo-Sikh War established East India Company dominance in the Punjab, and on 30 March 1849, the Punjab was proclaimed a province of British India. Lawrence was appointed to a three-man Board of Administration to govern the province, headed by his elder brother Henry. He was responsible for numerous reforms, including the abolition of internal duties and the establishment of a common currency and postal system. Lawrence championed improvements to local infrastructure and raising money for public works, including an extension of the Grand Trunk Road from Delhi to Peshawar, the construction of a highway from Lahore to Multan, and construction on the Bari Doab Canal which provided a boon to cultivators in the area. He was also known for being financially astute, overseeing a fifty percent increase in revenue and ensuring the Punjab was delivering a surplus of over one million pounds sterling within three years of the Board being instituted.

Lawrence disagreed with his brother Henry's policy of retaining the support of the local aristocracy, arguing it was too extravagant and hurting finances. In December 1852, having overseen a highly productive period of governance, the Lawrence brothers offered their resignations. Lord Dalhousie also feeling the necessity of a Board of Administration had ceased, sought to replace it with the new role of Chief Commissioner. Dalhousie rejected Lawrence's resignation, instead making him the first Chief Commissioner, meanwhile Henry went on to become Agent in Rajputana.

=== Chief Commissioner ===
As Chief Commissioner, Lawrence carried on the policies from before - public works were extended, industry and education encouraged and surveying completed. He granted greater authority to villages, and upheld the decisions of village headsmen. In addition, Lawrence now also had responsibility for managing the mercurial group of assistants recruited by his brother known as Henry Lawrence's "Young Men".

In February 1856, Lawrence returned to Calcutta to wish farewell to the departing Lord Dalhousie who was retiring to England. As a parting gift, Dalhouse recommended Lawrence for the honour of Knight Commander of the Order of the Bath. Whilst in Calcutta, Lawrence spent three days with Henry, in what would be the last time the brothers were together.

== Indian Mutiny ==
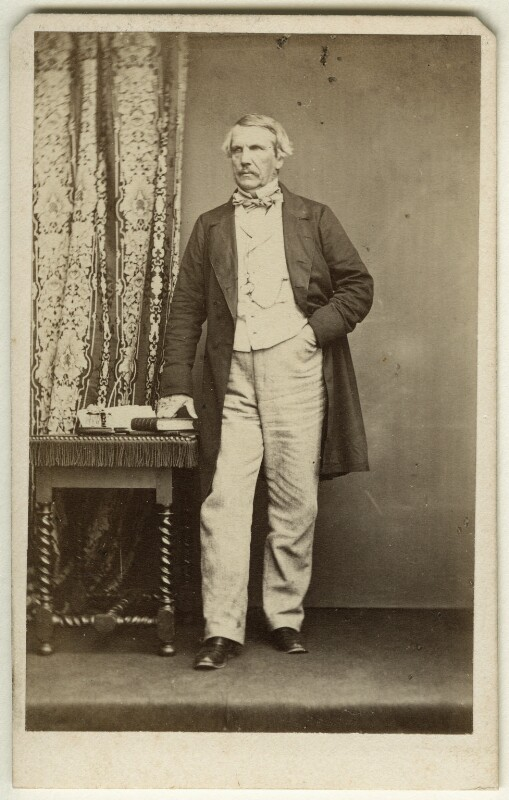
John Laird Mair Lawrence, 1st Baron Lawrence in 1860s

Lawrence was in Rawalpindi when he received news of a sepoy uprising in Meerut.

The Punjab garrison in May 1857 was 60,000 strong, consisting of 10,000 Europeans, 36,000 Hindustani sepoys and 14,000 Punjabi irregulars. His first step was to disarm potentially disaffected sepoys by splitting them into detachments and dispatching them to the Afghan frontier where they were less likely to rebel. His next steps were to send the Corps of Guides, 1st Punjabi's (Coke's Afridis), 4th Sikhs and 4th Punjab Infantry seven hundred miles to Delhi. To patrol the now militarily depleted Punjab, Lawrence then at the suggestion of John Nicholson and Herbert Edwardes deployed a movable column of lightly equipped European and Punjabi troops, and chose Neville Chamberlain to lead it.

To guarantee the loyalty of the Punjab, he requested Sikh chiefs show gratitude for leniency following annexation, and Patiala, Jhind, Nabha and Kapurthala all offered troops and money in support of the British. This ensured the lines of communication between Delhi and Lahore remained open. He wrote to influential Sikhs who had previously rebelled during the Second Sikh War, and successfully secured their support by offering them a chance of redemption if they lent support against the mutiny. Lawrence was also able to gain the support of Muslims in the Punjab such as the Nawab of Karnal.

As the fighting continued, Lawrence felt inclined to send the large contingent of European soldiers stationed at Peshawar to Delhi. This raised the prospect of an attack by Dost Mohammed Khan when the Peshawar garrison was left less secure. Lawrence's assistants, led by John Nicholson and even the Governor-General, Lord Canning, were insistent on the need to protect Peshawar. Lawrence nonetheless placed greater importance on the fall of Delhi, and pressed ahead with the re-deployment of troops to Delhi. By 6 September, Lawrence wrote to Lord Canning that the Punjab had sent every man they could spare. On 14 September, Delhi had been recaptured and due to his actions Lawrence was acclaimed as the 'Saviour of India'.

== Aftermath of Rebellion ==
In the immediate aftermath of the rebellion, the British perpetrated acts of vengeance, including summary executions. In February 1858 Delhi became part of the Punjab, and Lawrence took steps to check the acts of vengeance. That same month he wrote to Lord Canning urging him to permit sepoys who had not taken part in the mutiny to return home, and to grant an amnesty for those who did not murder anyone and had given up their arms.

Calls were made to raze Delhi to the ground, and dismantle the Jama Masjid, however Lawrence resisted such calls stating holy places should be spared. Popular opinion within British society was shaped by partisan reports of atrocities committed by the rebels and demanded the most severe retribution on the alleged culprits, an opinion which was resisted by Lord Canning and Lawrence. As many as 800,000 Indians and possibly more, both in the rebellion (150,000 dead) and in famines and epidemics of disease (650,000 dead) in its wake, by comparison of 1857 population estimates with the Indian Census of 1871. About 6,000 British occupiers or family members were killed.

In 1858, the Punjab was made a Lieutenant Governorship which resulted in an increase in staff and other privileges. In February 1859, Lawrence handed over power to Robert Montgomery and set sail for England. For his service in the mutiny he was created a baronet, granted a GCB, made a Privy Councillor and received an annual pension from the East India Company of £2,000. On arrival in England he was greeted with a lavish ceremony at Guildhall and afforded an audience with Queen Victoria. He also took up a role with the Council of India based at Whitehall.

Additionally he received the freedoms of the cities of London (1858) and Glasgow (1860), the freedom of the Worshipful Company of Grocers (1859) and honorary doctorates of civil law from the universities of Oxford and Cambridge (1859).

== Viceroy of India ==
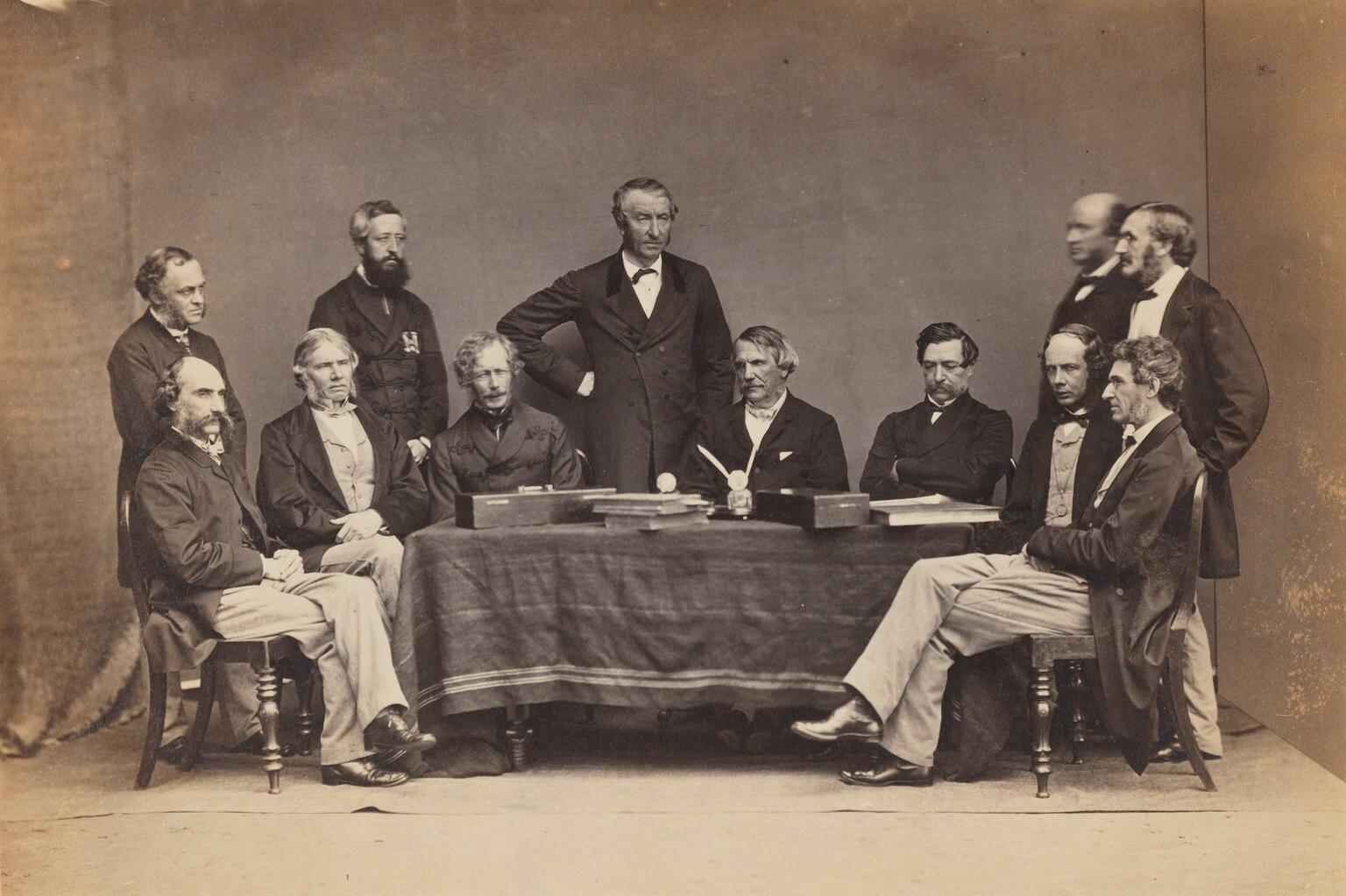
Sir John Lawrence as Viceroy of India, sitting middle, with his Executive Council members and Secretaries

On 12 January 1864, Lawrence returned to India, succeeding Lord Elgin as Viceroy of India. His stated ambitions as Viceroy were to consolidate British power and to improve the ‘condition of the people’. One of his first acts was to ban the Hindu practice of throwing their dead into the Hooghly River. To enable Lawrence to claim both his annuity from the East India Company and his full salary as Viceroy, the Salary of Sir J. Lawrence Act 1864 was passed in March 1864.

=== Domestic policy ===
Domestically, Lawrence sought to increase tenant security and to reduce fiscal assessments imposed on Indians, believing that what had worked in the Punjab would work across British India. He saw light taxation as a matter of fairness and pragmatism, arguing that for Indian yeomen to safeguard British rule it was essential that they should feel the benefits of a British administration. Lawrence resisted calls for increasing the taxation of salt that would have disproportionately affected poorer Indians. He calculated that the excise on salt increased its price as much as twelvefold in the Punjab, and perhaps by eight times in the North West Provinces. Lawrence abhorred the stance taken by many of his compatriots, who considered it their 'prerogative while in India to pay no taxation at all.' He characterised the non-official British community in India as 'birds of passage', rushing to amass wealth as quickly as possible with no care for what happened after their departure.

Arguably the greatest failure of Lawrence's tenure was the Orissa famine of 1866, in which an estimated one million Indians died. Part of the criticism focused on his moving the government apparatus to the cooler hills of Simla which was geographically remote from the centre of power in Calcutta. In response, Lawrence offered his resignation, but this was refused by Viscount Cranborne.

=== Foreign policy ===
Lawrence's fame and extensive regional knowledge afforded him considerable scope by Westminster in determining Indian foreign policy.

In June 1863, the Emir of Afghanistan, Dost Muhammad Khan, died, resulting in civil war within Afghanistan at a time when the British government were concerned with Russian expansionism in central Asia. Lawrence adopted a strategy of strict non-intervention on Afghanistan, devising a policy that would be known as 'masterly inactivity.' The policy meant no British envoys or troops were sent to Afghanistan, and civilian explorers were prohibited from wandering beyond the frontier. It has been argued the policy was shaped by Lawrence's experience of the First Anglo-Afghan War where his brother George was held captive.

Lawrence argued any attempt to restrain Russian advance in Afghanistan would lead to the eventual occupation of the country, as was the case in 1838. Vocal criticism of Lawrence's policy of ‘masterly inactivity’ came from serving or former British army officers in India such as Henry Rawlinson and Sir Sydney Cotton. Criticism centred on the belief that Britain's apparent passivity would allow Russia to establish her influence at Kabul.

== Return to England ==
Lawrence completed his five-year term as Viceroy and returned to England in January 1869. In April he was raised to the peerage as Baron Lawrence, of the Punjaub and of Grateley in the County of Southampton.

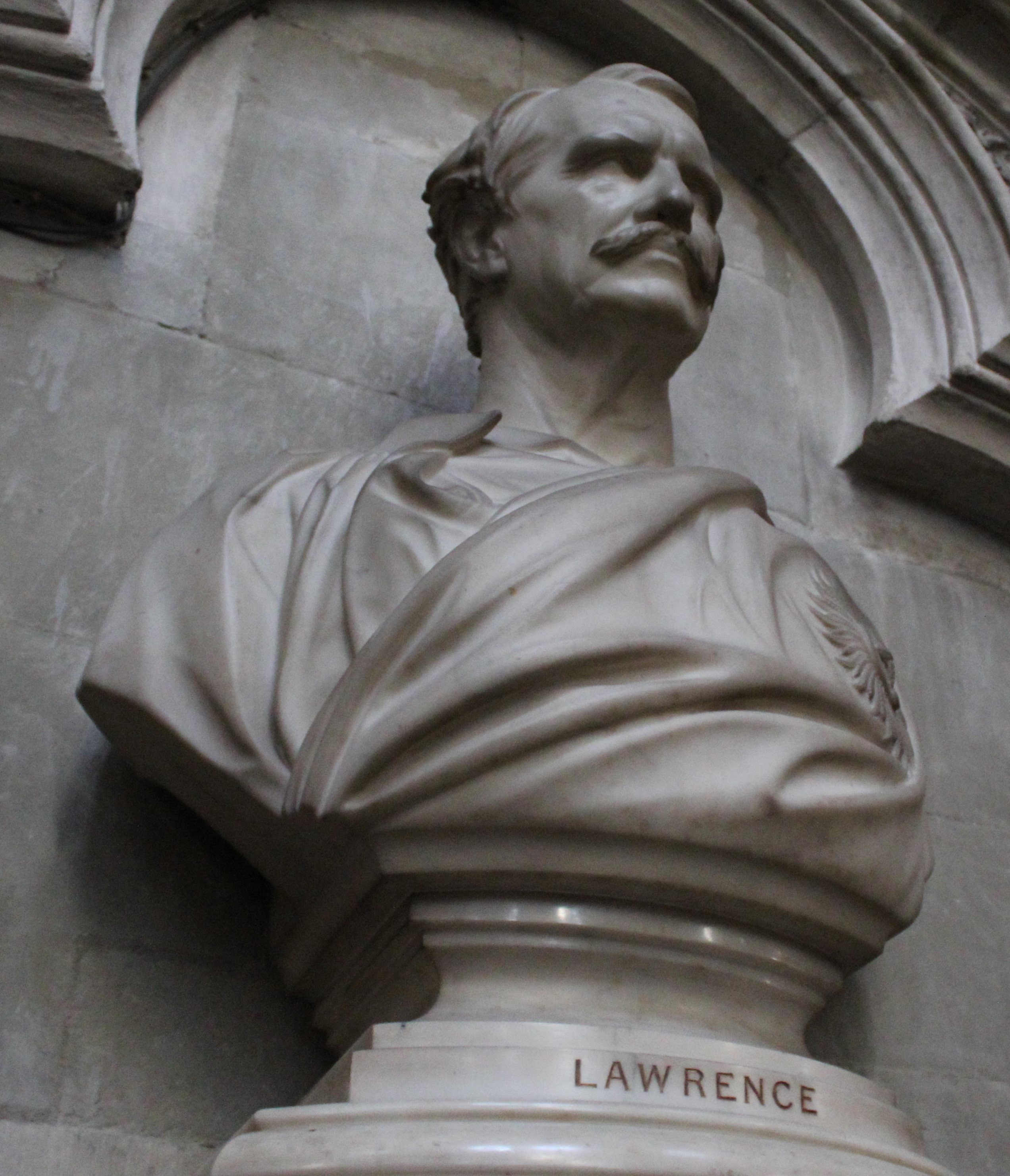
Bust of Lawrence in Westminster Abbey

Arthur Munby wrote in 1860:

Thursday, 31st. May:... Passing through Kensington Tuesday, (29th.May) I saw a man of all others worth seeing—Sir John Lawrence. He was riding down the street alone—without even a groom: and no one knew or noticed him. A large, loosely made man; sitting grave and quiet on his horse; with sallow wrinkled face and grizzled moustache: riding along, an unappreciated king of men, with such keen eyes and such a solemn face! And he all unnoticed, and still a commoner, while Vernon Smith is a peer! But idiots are proverbially the favourites of fortune.

In 1870 Lawrence was elected to represent the Chelsea division of the London School Board, and was appointed chairman at the first board meeting. He resigned from the position in November 1873.

From 1871-72, he chaired a Royal Commission into the beaching of HMS Megaera.

Lawrence briefly returned to the public sphere in 1878 as a critic of the Conservative government's Afghan policy in the months preceding the Second Afghan War. He was nominated chairman of an influential committee to oppose the policy of Lord Lytton and the Indian government, and to oppose annexation and imperialism.

Lawrence died in London on 27 June 1879, aged 68 and was buried at Westminster Abbey. A memorial bust of Lawrence by the sculptor Thomas Woolner was later erected in the nave of the Abbey.

== Family ==
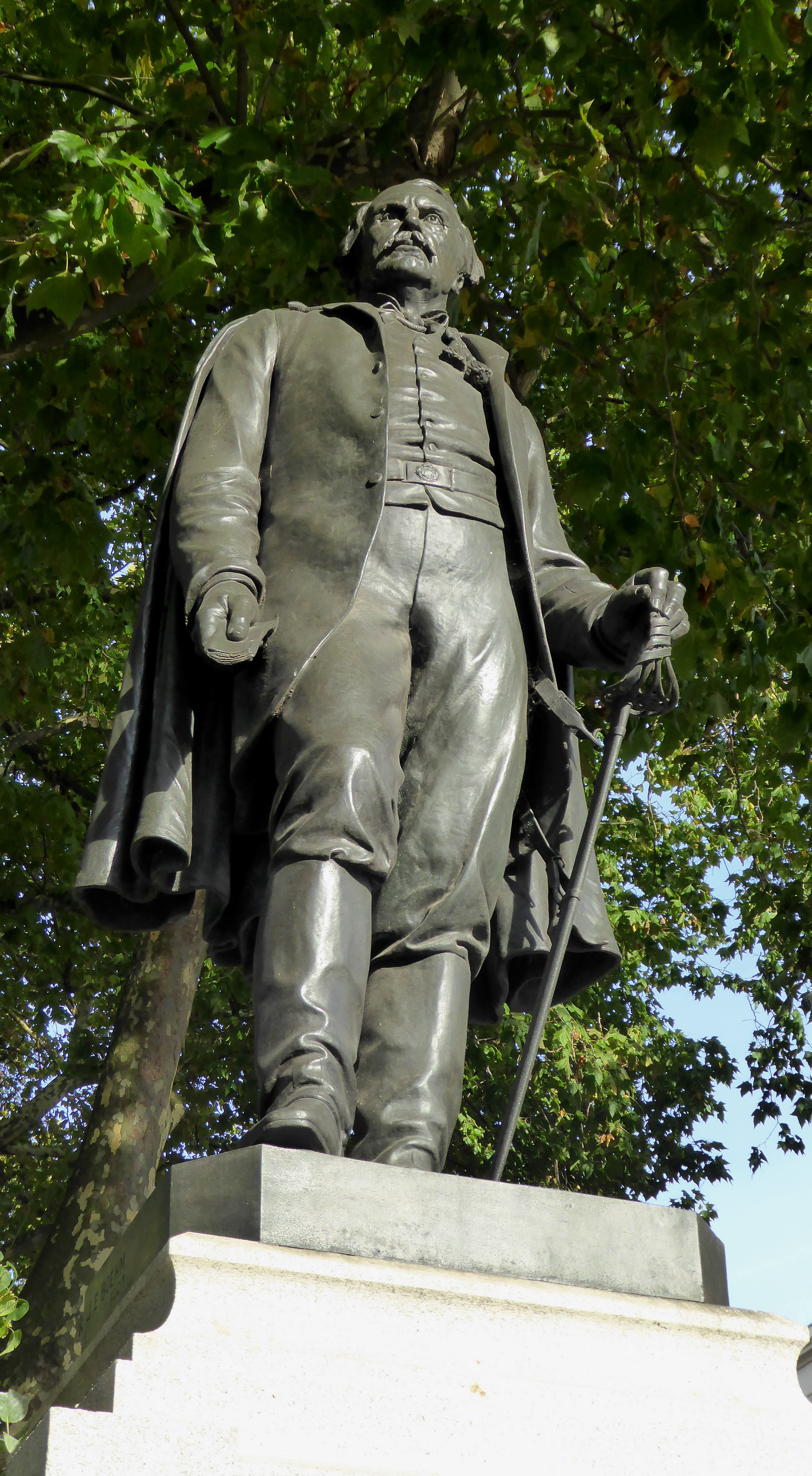
Statue of Lord Lawrence in Waterloo Place, London

Lawrence married Harriette Catherine, daughter of The Reverend Richard Hamilton, in 1841. They had four sons and six daughters:

- Catherine Letitia Lawrence (1843–1931), married Col. William Lowndes Randall
- Harriette Emily Lawrence (1844–1918), married Sir Henry Stewart Cunningham
- John Hamilton Lawrence (1845–1913), succeeded his father as the 2nd Baron Lawrence
- Henry Lawrence (1848–1902), a noted rugby player who captained England in two matches, including the first ever international against Ireland.
- Alice Margaret Lawrence (1850–1944), married Rev. Launcelot Charles Walford (1843–1936) on 14 July 1870. They had three daughters.
- Mary Emma Lawrence (1852–1939), married Francis William Buxton, son of Sir Edward North Buxton, 2nd Baronet on 27 February 1872. They had three sons, and five daughters.
- Charles Napier Lawrence (1854–1927), businessman and was created Baron Lawrence of Kingsgate in 1923.
- Edith Hamilton Lawrence (7 June 1860 – 24 February 1861), died in infancy
- Sir Herbert Alexander Lawrence (1861–1943), a First World War general and a banker.
- Dame Maude Agnes Lawrence (1865–1933), civil servant

Lady Lawrence died in 1917.

== Legacy ==
A boarding house at the East India Company College (today Haileybury and Imperial Service College) and a "house" at Foyle College was subsequently named after him. Lawrence is also a Senior Wing House at St Paul's School, Darjeeling, in India, where all the Senior Wing Houses are named after colonial-era civil service and military figures.

A statue of him stands at Foyle and Londonderry College (having been, originally, erected in Lahore). The statue, by Sir Joseph Edgar Boehm, once showed Lawrence with a pen in one hand and a sword in the other, along with the caption "By which will you be governed?". The pen and sword were used to illustrate his versatility as an administrator and a soldier. Vandals have since damaged the sword. Another statue of Lawrence stands in Waterloo Place in central London. The inscription on the base of the statue originally reads "John First Lord Lawrence, ruler of the Punjaub during the Sepoy Mutiny of 1857. Viceroy of India from 1864 to 1869. Erected by his fellow subjects, British and Indian, A.D. 1882.," but the word "Punjaub" (Punjab) has been defaced and rendered illegible by vandals.

== Arms ==
Coat of arms of John Lawrence, 1st Baron Lawrence
Crest Out of an eastern crown Or a cubit arm entwined by a wreath of laurel and holding a dagger all Proper. Escutcheon Ermine on a cross raguly Gules an eastern crown Or on a chief Azure two swords in saltire Proper pommels and hilts Gold between as many leopards’ faces Argent Supporters Dexter, an officer of the Guide Cavalry (Irregulars) of the Pathan tribe in the province of Peshawar habited and accoutred Proper. Sinister an officer of the Sikh Irregular cavalry also habited and accoutred Proper. Motto Be Ready

Government offices
Preceded by Sir William Denison (acting)	Viceroy of India; 1864–1869	Succeeded by The Earl of Mayo
New title	Chairman of the London School Board; 1870–1873	Succeeded by Sir Charles Reed
Peerage of the United Kingdom
New creation	Baron Lawrence; 1869–1879	Succeeded by John Hamilton Lawrence
Baronetage of the United Kingdom
New creation	Baronet (of the Army); 1858–1879	Succeeded by John Hamilton Lawrence
