= Kingsgate, Kent =

Hamlet in Kent, England

Coordinates: 51°22′59″N 1°26′36″E

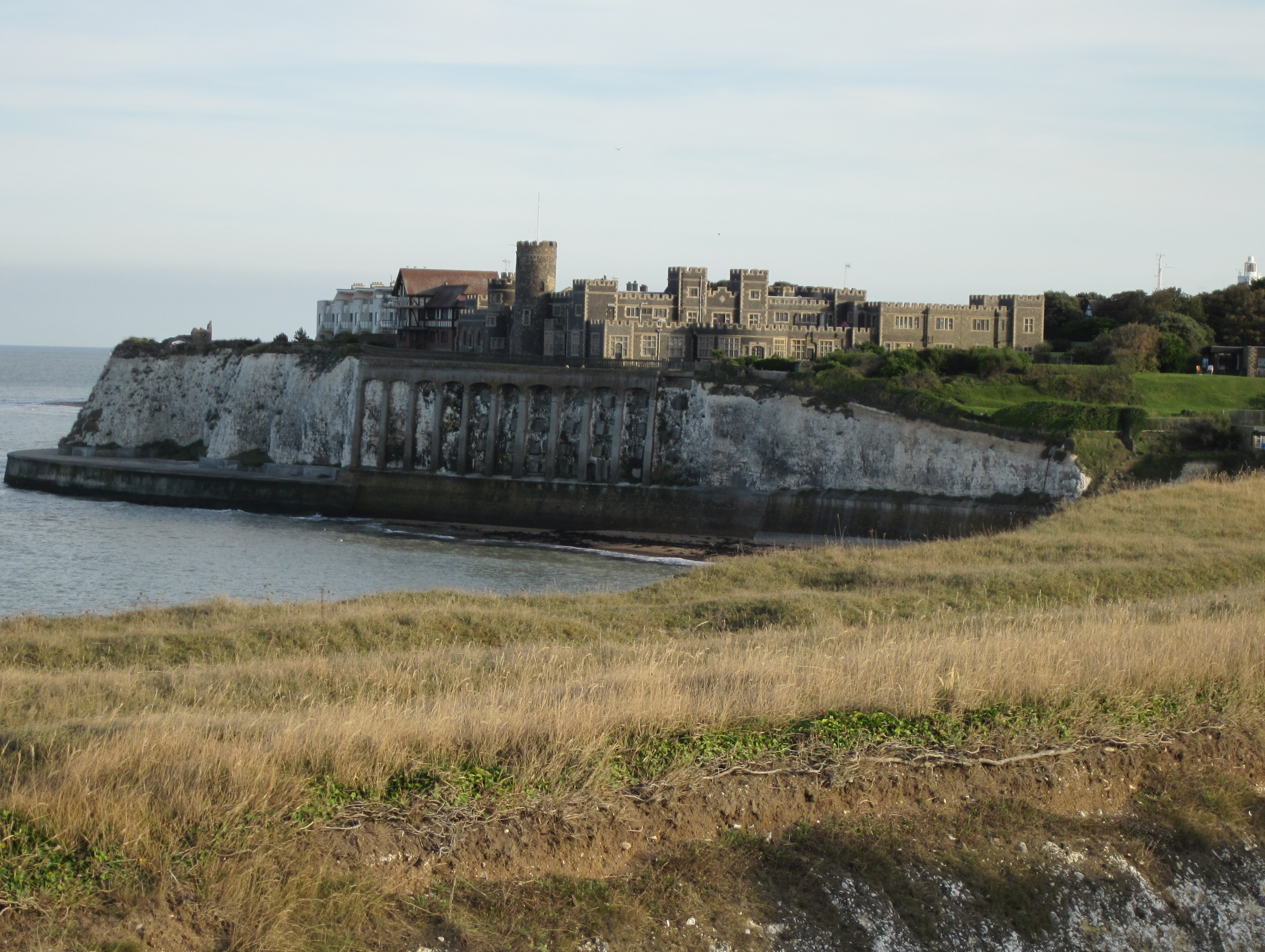
View of Kingsgate Bay to the south with Kingsgate Castle and the North Foreland lighthouse being just visible on the right of the photo.

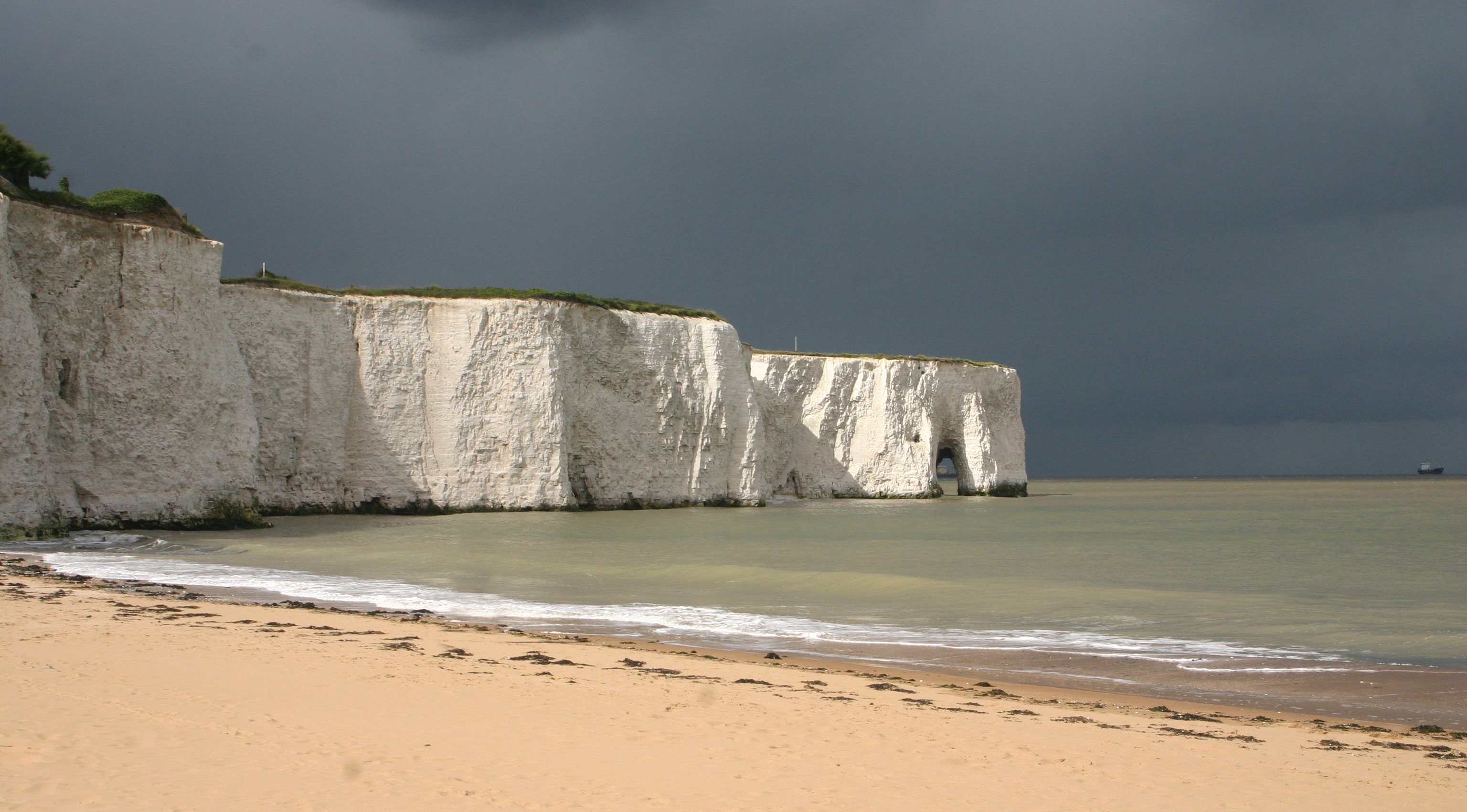
Cliffs to the north of Kingsgate Bay, Thanet, Kent

Kingsgate is a hamlet in St Peter's parish, Broadstairs, Kent. The name Kingsgate is related to an incidental landing of Charles II on 30 June 1683 (‘gate’ referring to a cliff-gap) though other English monarchs have also used this cove, such as George II in 1748. Kingsgate is the location of Holland House built between 1762 and 1768 by Henry Fox, 1st Baron Holland, of Holland House in Kensington.

The access to the beach was originally called Barthelmas Gate (St. Bartholomew's Gate) and after the first Kings landing was renamed. The original structures commemorating the landing were washed away by the sea in March, 1819. An arched gate was later built inland in the grounds of what is now a care home.
