= John Lawrence, 2nd Baron Lawrence =

John Hamilton Lawrence, 2nd Baron Lawrence (1 October 1846 – 22 August 1913) was a British peer and Conservative politician.

Lawrence was the son of John Laird Lawrence, 1st Baron Lawrence, Viceroy of India, and Harriett Katherine Hamilton. Sir Henry Montgomery Lawrence and George St Patrick Lawrence were his uncles. He succeeded his father as second Baron Lawrence in 1879 and took his seat on the Conservative benches in the House of Lords. In 1895 he was appointed a Lord-in-waiting (government whip in the House of Lords) in the Conservative administration of Lord Salisbury, a post he held until 1905, the last three years under the premiership of Arthur Balfour.

Lord Lawrence married Mary Caroline, only daughter of Richard Campbell, in 1872. He died in August 1913, aged 66, and was succeeded in his titles by his son Alexander. Lady Lawrence died in 1938.

Coat of arms of John Lawrence, 2nd Baron Lawrence
Crest Out of an eastern crown Or a cubit arm entwined by a wreath of laurel and holding a dagger all Proper. Escutcheon Ermine on a cross raguly Gules an eastern crown Or on a chief Azure two swords in saltire Proper pommels and hilts Gold between as many leopards' faces Argent Supporters Dexter, an officer of the Guide Cavalry (Irregulars) of the Pathan tribe in the province of Peshawar habited and accoutred Proper. Sinister an officer of the Sikh Irregular cavalry also habited and accoutred Proper. Motto Be Ready

== Notes ==
Peerage of the United Kingdom
Preceded by John Laird Lawrence	Baron Lawrence; 1879–1913	Succeeded by Alexander Graham Lawrence
