= Charles Lawrence, 1st Baron Lawrence of Kingsgate =

British businessman and railway executive

The Right Honourable The Lord Lawrence of Kingsgate
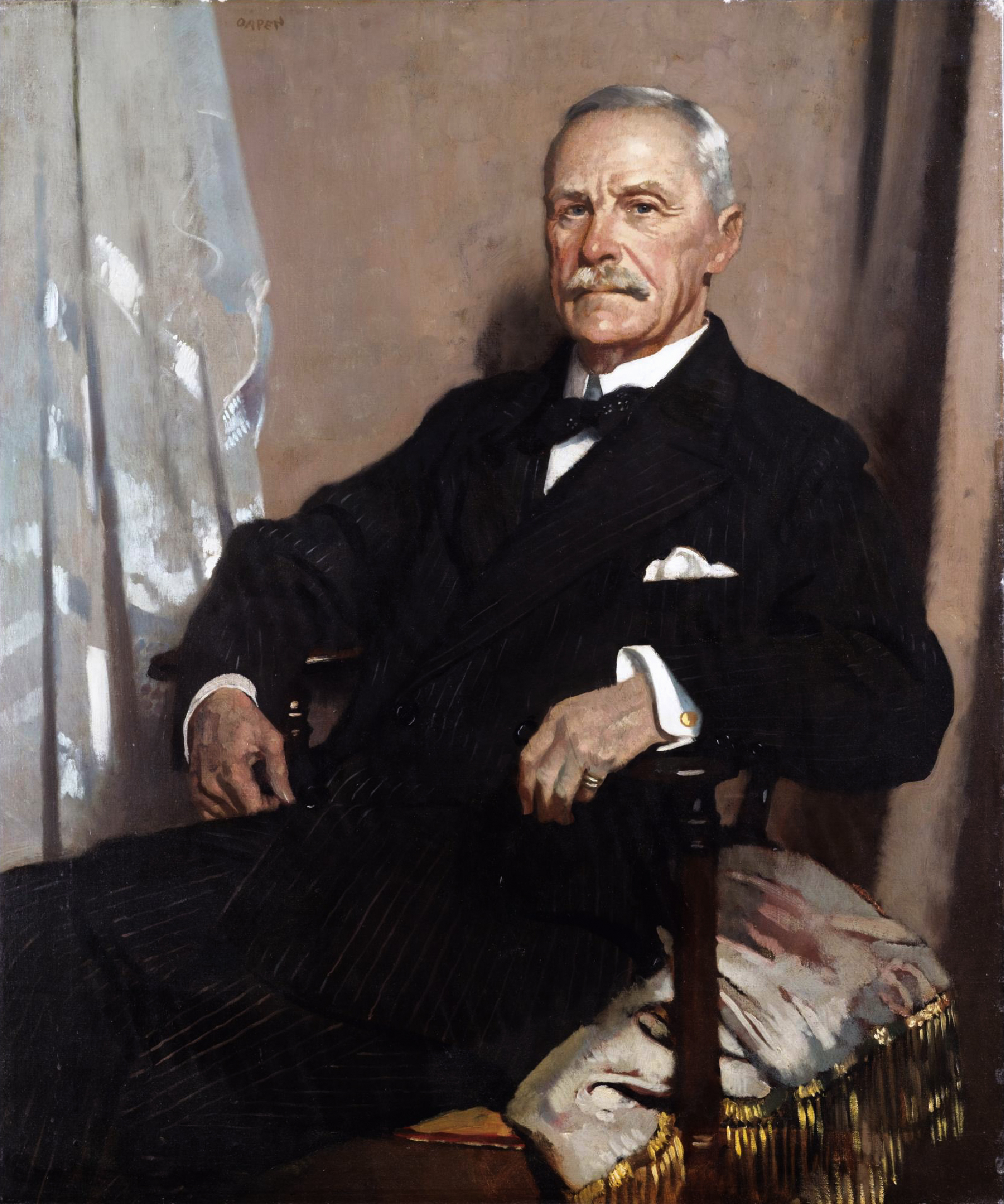
- Lord Lawrence of Kingsgate by William Orpen, 1927.

Personal details
- Born: 27 May 1855 Murree, British India
- Died: 17 December 1927 (aged 72) Eaton Square, London
- Spouse: Catherine Sumner (m. 1881)
- Parent: John Lawrence, 1st Baron Lawrence (father)

Charles Napier Lawrence, 1st Baron Lawrence of Kingsgate (27 May 1855 – 17 December 1927), styled The Honourable Charles Lawrence between 1869 and 1923, was a British businessman and railway executive.

== Background and education ==
Lawrence was born in India, the third son of John Lawrence, 1st Baron Lawrence, and Harriette Katherine Hamilton CI, daughter of Reverend Richard Hamilton. John Lawrence, 2nd Baron Lawrence, Henry Lawrence Herbert Lawrence were his brothers. He was educated at Marlborough College.

== Career ==
Lawrence was Chairman of the London and North Western Railway from 1921 to 1923 and of the London, Midland and Scottish Railway from 1923 to 1924 as well as Chairman of the North British and Mercantile Insurance Company and the Antofagasta and Bolivia Railway. In 1915, his portrait was commissioned by the shareholders of Antofagasta and Bolivia Railway in commemoration of his chairmanship of the company, a position he had held since 1908. The portrait was painted by Walter William Ouless. In the 1923 Birthday Honours he was elevated to the peerage as Baron Lawrence of Kingsgate, of Holland House, Kingsgate, in the County of Kent. He is recorded as having spoken twice in the House of Lords.

== Personal life ==
On 22 June 1881, Lawrence married American Catherine Sumner, only daughter of Frederick Wiggin Sumner of New York City, niece of James W. Gerard and great-niece of General Edwin Vose Sumner. There were no children from the marriage. Lord Lawrence of Kingsgate died in December 1927, aged 72, when the barony became extinct. Lady Lawrence of Kingsgate died 7 November 1934.

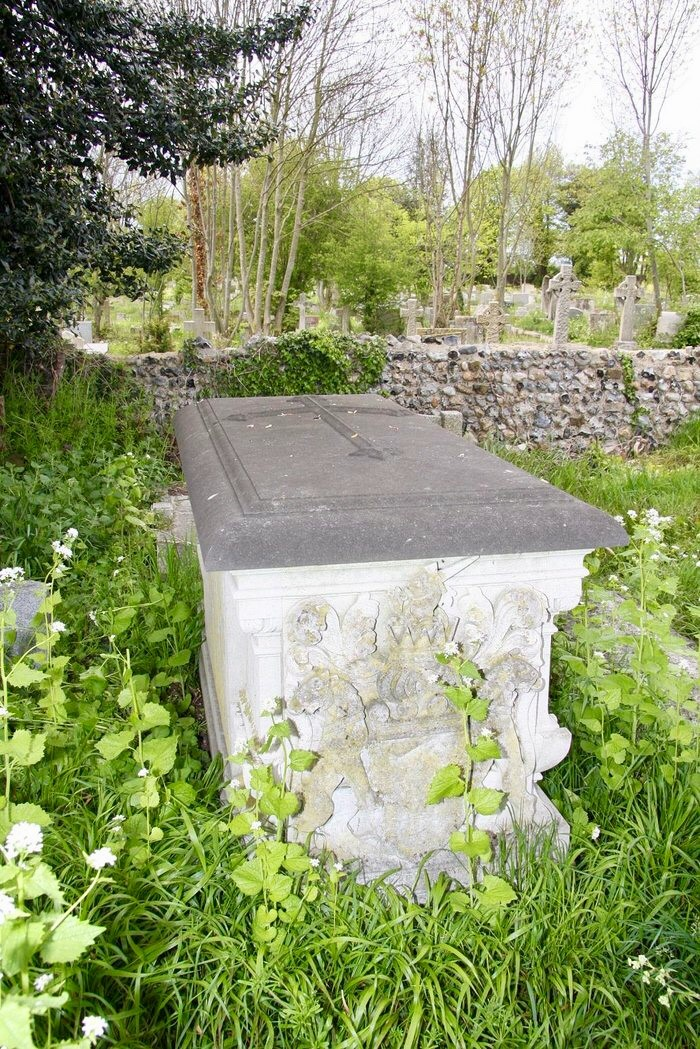
The grave of Charles Lawrence, 1st Baron Lawrence of Kingsgate, in the churchyard of St Peter's, Kent

== Arms ==
Coat of arms of Charles Lawrence, 1st Baron Lawrence of Kingsgate
Crest Out of an eastern crown Or a cubit arm entwined by a wreath of laurel and holding a dagger all Proper. Escutcheon Ermine on a cross raguly Gules an eastern crown Or on a chief Azure two swords in saltire Proper pommels and hilts Gold between as many leopards’ faces Argent Supporters Dexter, an officer of the Guide Cavalry (Irregulars) of the Pathan tribe in the province of Peshawar habited and accoutred Proper. Sinister an officer of the Sikh Irregular cavalry also habited and accoutred Proper. Motto Be Ready

Peerage of the United Kingdom
New creation	Baron Lawrence of Kingsgate; 1923–1927	Extinct
