= George St Patrick Lawrence =

Officer in the British Indian Army

Sir George St Patrick Lawrence
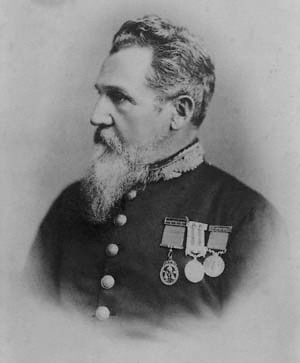
- Born: 17 March 1804; Trincomalee, Ceylon
- Died: 16 November 1884 (aged 80); Kensington Park Gardens, London, United Kingdom
- Spouse: Charlotte Browne (m. 1830)
- Relatives: Sir Henry Lawrence (brother); John Lawrence, 1st Baron Lawrence (brother)
- Military career
- Allegiance: East India Company; United Kingdom
- Branch: Bengal Army
- Service years: 1821–1866
- Rank: Lieutenant General
- Unit: Second Bengal Light Cavalry
- Conflicts: First Anglo-Afghan War: Battle of Ghazni; First Anglo-Sikh War; Second Anglo-Sikh War; Indian Mutiny
- Awards: Knight Commander of the Order of the Star of India; Companion of the Order of the Bath; Companion of the Order of the Durrani Empire

Lieutenant General Sir George St Patrick Lawrence, KCSI, CB (17 March 1804 – 16 November 1884) was an officer in the British Indian Army.

== Early life ==
Lawrence, third son of Lieutenant Colonel Alexander Lawrence (1764–1835), was elder brother of both Sir Henry Lawrence and John Lawrence, 1st Baron Lawrence. His father, an Indian officer, led, with three other lieutenants, the storming of Seringapatam on 4 May 1799, and returned to England in 1809, after fifteen years' severe service.

Lawrence was born into an Ulster-Scots family at Trincomalee, Ceylon, on 17 March 1804, and was later educated at Foyle College in Derry. Both his parents were from Ulster, the northern province in Ireland, his father being from Coleraine in County Londonderry while his mother, Letitia Knox, was from County Donegal. His middle name, St Patrick, derived from his birth on St Patrick's Day.

In 1819, he entered Addiscombe Military Seminary, on 5 May 1821 was appointed a cavalry cadet, on 15 January 1822, joined the Second Bengal Light Cavalry in Bengal, and on 5 September 1825 was promoted to be adjutant of his regiment, a post he held until September 1834. With his regiment he took part in the Afghan War of 1838, and was present at the storming of Ghuznee (modern Ghazni) on 23 July 1839, and in the attempt to capture Dost Mohammad Khan in his flight in August through the Bamyan pass.

== Kabul ==
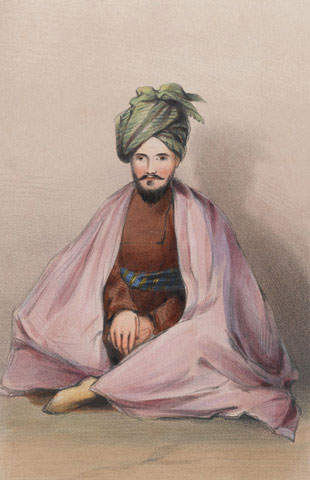
Captain George Lawrence, 11th Light Cavalry, attached to the Political Service, 1842.

On returning to Kabul, Lawrence became political assistant to Sir William Hay Macnaghten, the envoy of Afghanistan, and subsequently his military secretary, a post which he kept from September 1839 to the death of his chief.

On the surrender of Dost Mahomed Khan, 3 November 1840, he was placed in the charge of Lawrence until he was sent to Calcutta. In the revolution at Cabul, in November 1841, Lawrence had many narrow escapes of his life, and on the surrender of the troops, he was one of the four officers delivered up on 11 December 1841 as hostages for the performance of the stipulations. On 23 December, when Macnaghten and others were treacherously murdered by Akbar Khan, he was saved by the interposition of Mahomed Shah Khan.

In the retreat from Kabul, 6 January 1842, Lawrence had charge of the ladies and children, with whom he remained until 8 January, when he was again given up to Akbar Khan as a hostage. With the ladies and children, he was imprisoned and remained with them until their release on 17 September 1842.

He owed his safety during this period to the high opinion which Akbar Khan had of his character, and to his strict adherence to all the promises which he made to his captor. Ill-health obliged Lawrence to return to England in August 1843, and shortly after that date the East India Company awarded him £600 in testimony of their sense of his services in Afghanistan.

== Return to India ==
On his going back to India in October 1846, he was appointed an assistant political agent in the Punjab, having charge over the important Rajputana district. In the autumn of 1847, with only two thousand troops, Lawrence engaged and defeated on two occasions large numbers of the hill men of the tribes on the Swat border. On the breaking out of the second Sikh War in 1848, Lawrence's great personal influence at Peshawar for some time kept his regiments faithful, but at last they went over to the enemy, and, on 25 October 1848 he was a prisoner in the hands of Chuttur Singh, but was three times permitted to leave his captivity on parole.

With his wife and children, he was released on 22 February 1849, in the peace following the Battle of Gujrat, and received the thanks of both houses of parliament and of the governor-general for remaining at his post with such devotion. On 7 June 1849, he was promoted to be brevet lieutenant-colonel and appointed deputy commissioner of Peshawar. The following November, in the capacity of political officer, he accompanied the forces sent under General Bradshaw into the Yusufzai country and was present at the capture of Pullee on the Swat border.

Again in February 1850, in command of militia, he went with Sir Charles Napier to the forcing of the Kohat pass and guided him through that defile. In July 1850 he became political agent in Méwar, one of the Rajputana states, where he remained until 13 March 1857, when he succeeded his brother Henry Lawrence as resident or chief agent for the governor-general in the Rajputana states, and in April took up his residence in Abu. On the breaking out of the Indian rebellion of 1857 he was named brigadier-general of all the forces in Rajputana, and on the death of Colonel Dixon on 12 June 1857, he took chief military command. By his vigorous and decided action the arsenal of Ajmer was retained; a proclamation confirmed the native princes in their loyalty, and the Rajputana states were prevented from joining the revolt. Such outbreaks as did take place were successfully quelled, first by himself, and afterwards by Major-General Roberts.

== Retirement and later life ==
On 18 May 1860, Lawrence was created a Companion of the Order of the Bath. He was gazetted major general on 25 May 1861 and, in December 1864, he resigned his post in Rajputana thereby ending his Indian career after forty-three years service. Both Sir Charles Napier and Lord Dalhousie had expressed their high regard for his character and achievements. "He is a right good soldier," said the former, "and a right good fellow, and my opinion of him is high."

On 11 January 1865, he received a good-service pension of £100 a year and, on 24 May 1866, he was created a Knight Commander of the Order of the Star of India. He was also made a Companion of the Order of the Durrani Empire. He retired from the army on full pay on 29 October 1866 and was advanced to honorary lieutenant general on 11 January 1867.

== Death ==
Lawrence died at 20 Kensington Park Gardens, London, on 16 November 1884, aged 80.

== Personal life ==
Lawrence married Charlotte Isabella, daughter of Dr. Benjamin Browne (M.D. of the Bengal Medical Board), on 3 April 1830. She died on 12 May 1878, having borne him three sons and six daughters.

== Memoir ==
Lawrence wrote a memoir, Forty-three Years in India, which was published in 1874, a decade before his death.
