= Battle of Gujrat =

1849 battle of the Anglo-Sikh War

- Part of the Second Anglo-Sikh War
- 1850 aquatint of the battle
Date	21 February 1849
Location	Gujrat, Sikh Empire (modern-day Pakistan)
Result	British victory

Belligerents
East India Company	Sikh Empire

Commanders and leaders
Hugh Gough	Sher Singh

Strength
24,000 men (including Bengal and Maratha troops); Over 96 field guns 67 siege guns	20,000 men 59 guns

Casualties and losses
96 killed 710 wounded	Unknown or 4,000; 53 guns captured

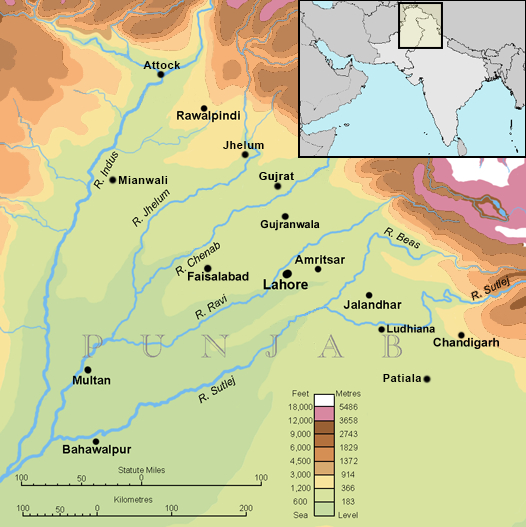
Location of Gujrat City in Punjab.

The Battle of Gujrat was a decisive battle in the Second Anglo-Sikh War, fought on 21 February 1849, between the forces of the East India Company, and a Sikh army in rebellion against the company's control of the Sikh Empire, represented by the child Maharaja Duleep Singh who was in British custody in Lahore. The Sikh army was defeated by the British regular and Bengal Army forces of the British East India Company. After it capitulated a few days later, the Punjab was annexed to the East India Company's territories and Duleep Singh was deposed.

== Outbreak and course of the war ==
After the British victory in the First Anglo-Sikh War, the Punjab was indirectly governed by a British representative at the Durbar (court) in Lahore and Agents in several of the regions. The Sikh Army, the Khalsa, was kept in being and used to keep order in the Punjab and North West Frontier Region. The Khalsa regarded itself as betrayed rather than defeated in the first war, and several of its Sardars (Generals) plotted rebellion.

The first outbreak came at Multan on 18 April 1848, where rebellious troops murdered a British agent, Lieutenant Patrick Vans Agnew, and expelled a Sardar imposed as ruler by the British Resident at Lahore. The former ruler, Dewan Mulraj, resumed his authority and prepared for a siege. Rather than use large forces from the British and Bengal Armies during the hot weather and monsoon seasons, the Governor General of Bengal, Lord Dalhousie, deployed part of the Khalsa and other irregular contingents against Mulraj. On 14 September, the troops from the Khalsa besieging Multan under Sardar Sher Singh Attariwalla also rebelled. They did not join Mulraj however, but moved north along the Chenab River into the main Sikh-populated area of the Punjab to gather recruits and obtain supplies.

Late in 1848, a large British and Bengal army took the field during the cold weather season under the Commander in Chief of the Bengal Army, General Sir Hugh Gough. Gough already had a reputation, whether deserved or not, for unimaginative head-on tactics. On 22 November at Ramnagar, his cavalry were repulsed attacking a Sikh bridgehead on the east bank of the Chenab River. Then on 13 January 1849, he launched a hasty frontal attack against Sher Singh's army at Chillianwala near the Jhelum River and was driven back with heavy casualties. Several days' heavy rain followed, preventing either army from renewing the battle. After they had faced each other for three days, both withdrew.

== Prelude to the Battle ==
Rather than launch a counter-attack against Gough, Sher Singh's aim was to join forces with the troops under his father, Sardar Chattar Singh Attariwalla. Chattar Singh's army had been confined to the Hazara region for several months by Muslim irregulars under British officers. At the start of 1849, Amir Dost Mohammad Khan of Afghanistan had sided with the rebellious Sikhs. His aim was to recover the area around Peshawar, which had been conquered by Ranjit Singh early in the nineteenth century, but his support was half-hearted. Nevertheless, when 3,500 Afghan horsemen reconquered Peshawar and approached the vital fort of Attock on the Indus River, its garrison of Muslim troops defected. This allowed Chattar Singh to move out of Hazara and link up with Sher Singh near Rawalpindi.

On the British side, once news of Chillianwala reached Britain, Gough was almost immediately superseded. His replacement was General Charles James Napier, who would require several weeks to travel from England. In the meantime, the Siege of Multan had resumed, and Mulraj was forced to surrender on 22 January. This allowed the bulk of the besieging force, under General Whish, to reinforce Gough's army. In particular, they brought large numbers of heavy guns with them. Gough, who had received word of his dismissal but who remained in command until formally relieved, advanced against the Sikh army. He had three infantry divisions (under Whish, Sir Colin Campbell and Sir Walter Gilbert) and a large cavalry force (under Sir Joseph Thackwell), with 94 guns of various weights and calibres.

In spite of his successes, Sher Singh, who commanded the combined Sikh forces, was running out of strategic options. His large army was unable to find enough food. Any move north or west to obtain supplies would involve abandoning the main Sikh-populated area of the Punjab and moving into potentially hostile Muslim areas. He therefore attempted a bold outflanking move against Gough. His army moved east, intending to cross the Chenab and then move south before crossing the river again to attack Gough from the rear. When they reached the river, they found it swollen by heavy rains, and the few fords were defended by irregular Muslim cavalry under British officers, later reinforced by some of the troops marching up from Multan.

== Battle ==
According to Patwant Singh, the British force consisted of 56,636 infantry, 11,569 cavalry, 96 field guns, and 67 siege guns against a Sikh force of 20,000. According to Patwant, the British were eventually victorious due to their artillery.

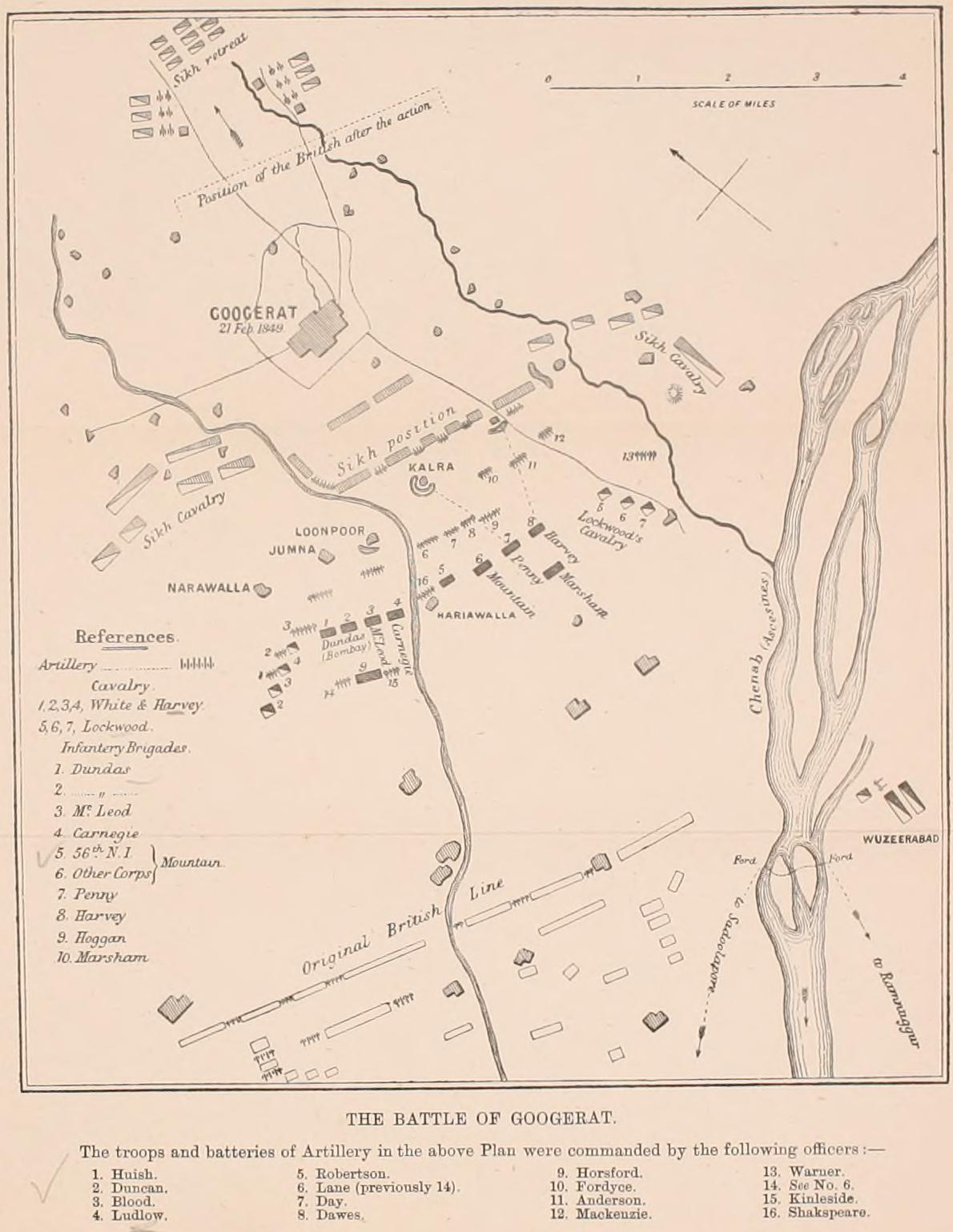
Map of the battle

Sher Singh withdrew to Gujrat, where his army hastily prepared a defensive position. The Sikhs constructed a double entrenchment, which was also protected by a ravine. Most of the artillery was grouped in a central battery, screened by hastily planted bushes. The cavalry was deployed on the flanks. Several small villages in advance of the central battery were occupied by infantry, and the houses and buildings were prepared with "loopholes" for defence. Although the position was strong, it was exposed to British artillery fire, and the hastily erected screen of brush was not as effective as the belts of scrub and jungle which had hidden the Sikh artillery from view at Chillianwala.

Early on 21 February, Gough advanced against this position, within sight of the Gujrat Fort. When the Sikh artillery opened fire and disclosed their position, Gough halted his advance and deployed his large numbers of heavy guns against them. In a three-hour artillery duel, the Sikhs were forced to abandon their guns. Sikh and Indian sources were later to refer to the battle as the "Battle of the Guns". Once the Sikh artillery was largely silenced, the British infantry advanced. There was desperate hand-to-hand fighting for the small fortified villages of Barha Kalra and Chota Kalra. However, the British guns were being advanced in successive "bounds", in many cases enfilading the Sikh infantry in the centre of their position.

On both flanks, the Sikh cavalry tried to outflank and attack Gough's army. Gough and Thackwell had deployed their British and Irregular cavalry regiments to the flanks, while keeping the regular Bengal Native Cavalry regiments in reserve. On Gough's left, the Sikh and Afghan horsemen were halted by fire from two batteries of Bengal Horse Artillery and then driven back by a squadron of the British 9th Lancers and the 2nd Scinde Irregular Horse, who delivered a charge at great speed and in close order.

The entire Sikh army eventually broke in disorder. Gough reported after the battle:

The heavy artillery continued to advance with extraordinary celerity, taking up successive forward positions, driving the enemy from those [positions] they had retired to, whilst the rapid advance and beautiful fire of the Horse Artillery and light field-batteries ... broke the ranks of the enemy at all points. The whole infantry line now rapidly advanced and drove the enemy before it; the nulla [ravine] was cleared, several villages stormed, the guns that were in position carried, the camp captured and the enemy routed in every direction

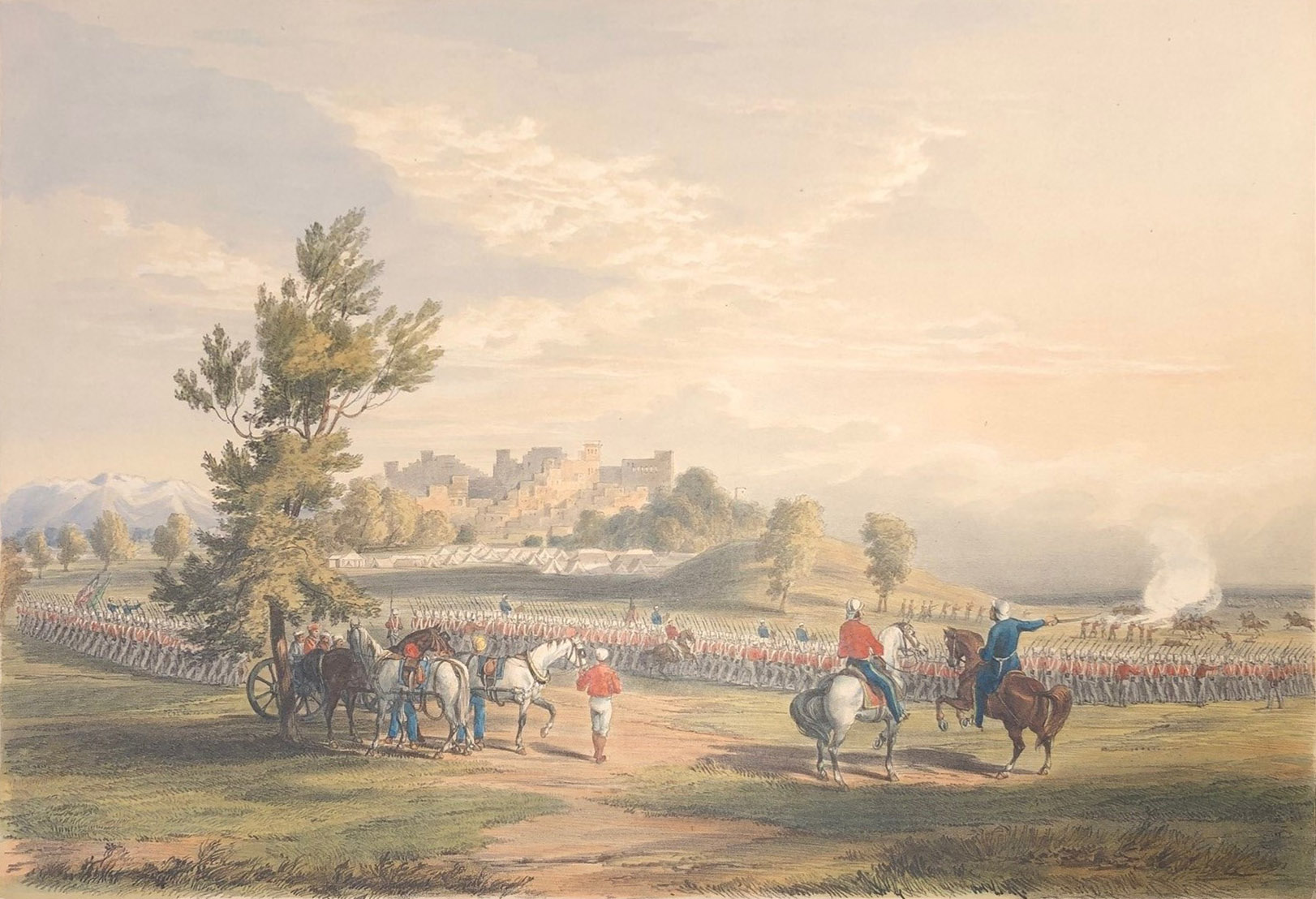
Battle of Gujrat, on 21 February 1849, as witnessed by James Henry Lawrence-Archer

The British at Gujrat showed no mercy to the surrendering or fleeing enemies. The Bengal Horse Artillery and British and Indian cavalry took up a ruthless and merciless pursuit, which turned the Sikh retreat into a rout over 12 miles (19 km), and during which 53 Sikh guns were captured.

== Aftermath ==
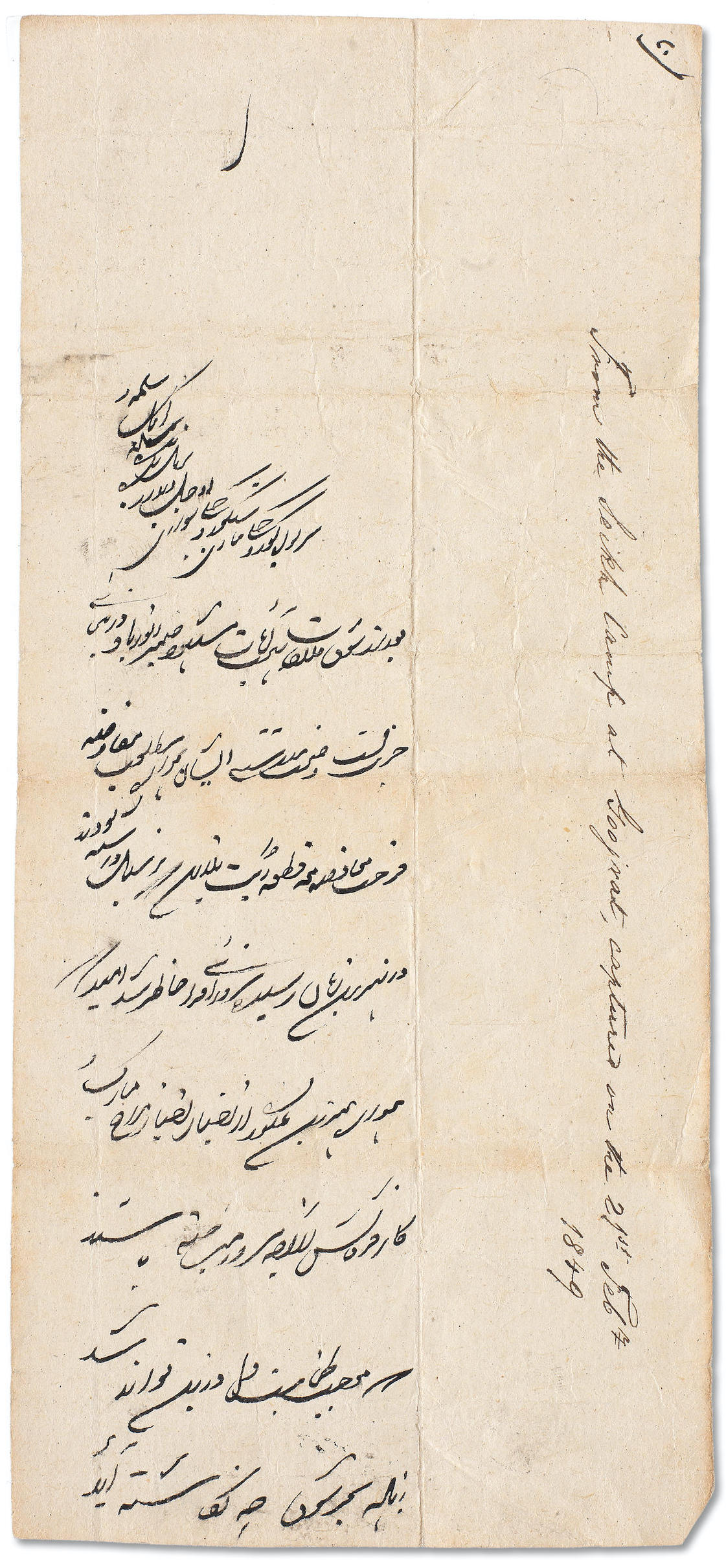
Military despatch from Mir Singh, general in the Sikh Khalsa Army, to British officer, Sir Paul, recovered by the British after the Battle of Gujrat, circa early 1849

The next day, a division under Major General Sir Walter Gilbert took up the pursuit. Many Sikh stragglers abandoned their army. Those who made their way to their homes over the Chenab were allowed to do so after they surrendered their arms. The remnants of Sher Singh's forces retreated across the Jhelum River and into progressively rougher country with Muslim villages for eleven days. Gulab Singh Dogra and Abbot cut-off any possibility of the Sikhs from joining the Afghan forces in the frontier. The Attariwalas Chattar Singh and his son Sher Singh, being surrounded on all sides by enemy forces, agreed to British terms for surrender on 14 March 1849 at the British camp at Hurmel near Rawalpindi to General Gilbert. Sher Singh's army, reduced to 20,000 men (mainly irregular cavalry) and 10 guns, handed over its arms at a two-day ceremony on 12 March and disbanded. As per General Thackwell, the Khalsa soldiers were visibly saddened, disgusted, and angry when giving up their arms to the British, one grey-bearded Khalsa veteran remarked in Punjabi: Aj Ranjit Singh mar gaya ("Today Ranjit Singh has died").

The small Afghan contingent also hastily retreated, destroying the pontoon bridge at Attock behind them. The Afghan forces eventually returned to their nation. The Scinde Irregular Horse followed them, and reoccupied Peshawar. Dost Mohammed later concluded a peace with the East India Company, acknowledging their possession of the Peshawar region.

The Punjab was formally annexed to British territory at Lahore on 2 April 1849.

At the end of his career, Gough had finally fought a model battle, using his vast superiority in heavy guns to drive Sher Singh's troops from their position without resorting to the bayonet as he usually did, and turning their retreat into a rout with his cavalry and horse artillery. He had also been able to operate for the first time without receiving contradictory instructions from Dalhousie. Throughout the war, Dalhousie had alternately goaded on and restrained Gough, usually at the most inconvenient moments.

== Order of battle ==
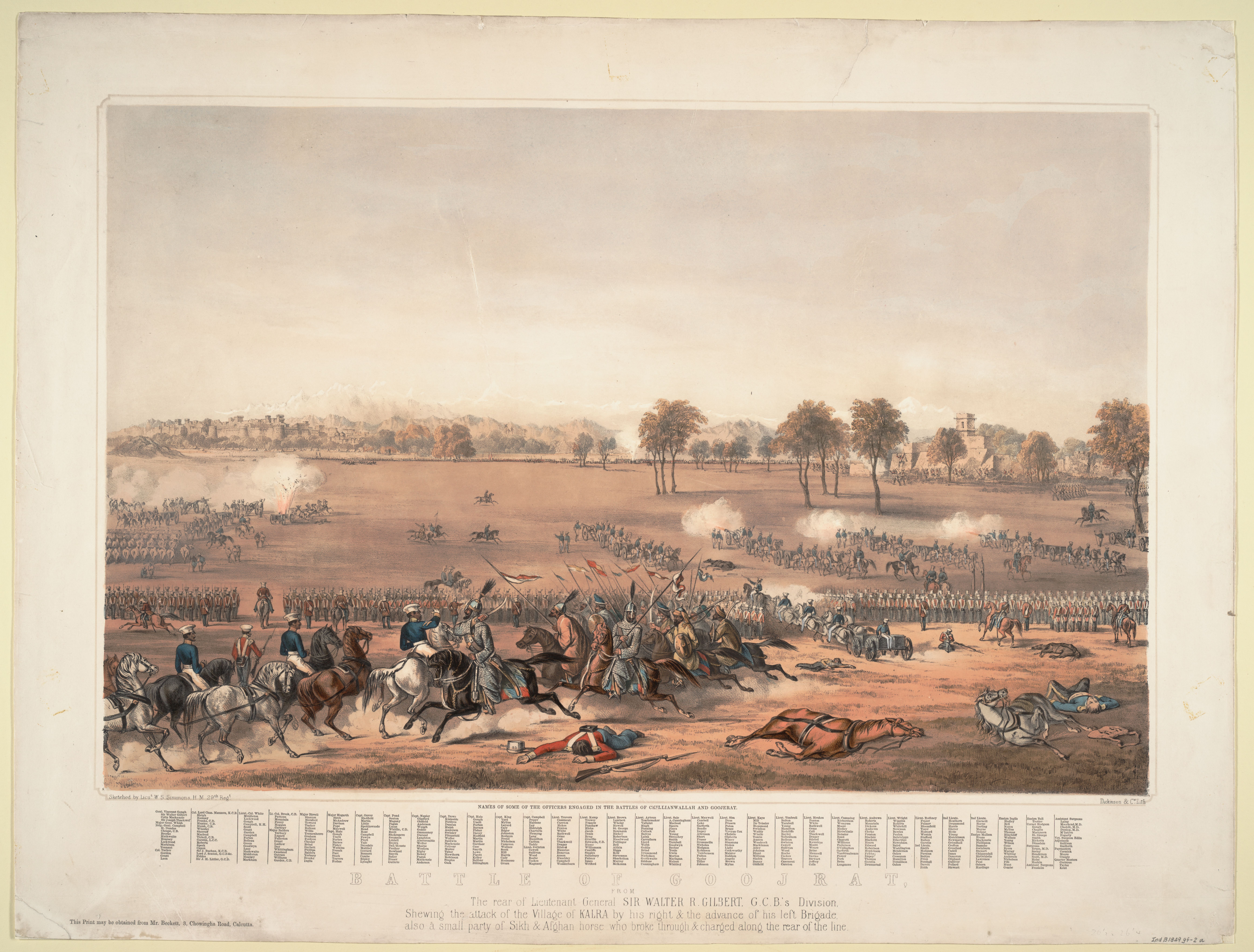
Battle of Gujrat, lithograph by Dickinson & Co, London after Lieut. W. S. Simmons, H.M. 29th Regt. with a list of officers

=== British regiments ===
- 3rd King's Own Light Dragoons
- 9th Queen's Royal Light Dragoons (Lancers)
- 14th the King's Light Dragoons
- 16th Queen's Light Dragoons (Lancers)
- 10th Foot
- 24th Foot
- 29th Foot
- 32nd Foot
- 1st Battalion, 60th Rifles
- 61st Foot

=== British Indian Army regiments ===
- 1st Bengal Light Cavalry
- 5th Bengal Light Cavalry
- 6th Bengal Light Cavalry
- 2nd Bengal (European) Light Infantry
- 8th Bengal Native Infantry
- 15th Bengal Native Infantry
- 20th Bengal Native Infantry
- 25th Bengal Native Infantry
- 30th Bengal Native Infantry
- 31st Bengal Native Infantry
- 46th Bengal Native Infantry
- 56th Bengal Native Infantry
- 69th Bengal Native Infantry
- 70th Bengal Native Infantry
- 72nd Bengal Native Infantry
- Maratha Light Infantry

== Sources ==
- Ian Hernon, "Britain's forgotten wars", Sutton Publishing, 2003, ISBN 0-7509-3162-0
- Roy, Kaushik (2008). "Battle of Gujrat (1849)". In Hodge, Carl Cavanagh (ed.). Encyclopedia of the Age of Imperialism, 1800-1914: Volume 1 (A-K). Greenwood Publishing Group. ISBN 978-0-313-33406-1.
- Charles Allen, "Soldier Sahibs", Abacus, 2001, ISBN 0-349-11456-0
