= 6th Bengal European Regiment =

Infantry regiment of the British East India Company

The 6th Bengal European Regiment was an infantry regiment of the British East India Company, created in 1858 (167 years ago) and disbanded in 1867 (158 years ago).

The regiment was raised in Bengal by the East India Company in 1858, for service in the Indian Mutiny; the "European" in the name indicated that it was composed of white soldiers, not Indian sepoys. The regiment was composed of officers drawn from two Indian units which had mutinied, the 7th Bengal Native Infantry and 8th Bengal Native Infantry.

As with all other "European" units of the Company, they were placed under the command of the Crown following the end of the Mutiny in 1858. The regiment was reduced to cadre strength in 1861, and disbanded in 1867.
