= Rajput Regiment =

Regiment of the Indian Army

- Rajput Regiment insignia
- Active: 1778–present
- Country: India
- Allegiance: British India (1778–1947); India (1947–present)
- Branch: British Indian Army (1778-1947); Indian Army (1947–present)
- Type: Line Infantry
- Role: Combat; Land warfare
- Size: 23 Battalions
- Regimental Centre: Fatehgarh, Uttar Pradesh
- Motto: Sarvatra Vijay (Victory Everywhere)
- War Cry: "Bol Bajrangbali ki Jai"
- Decorations: 1 Param Vir Chakra, 3 Ashoka Chakra, 5 Param Vishisht Seva Medals, 7 Maha Vir Chakras, 12 Kirti Chakras, 5 Ati Vishisht Seva Medals, 66 Vir Chakras, 20 Shaurya Chakras 8 Yudh Seva Medals, 313 Sena Medals, 19 Vishisht Seva Medals, 1 Bar to Vishisht Seva Medal, 1 Padma Shri
- Battle honours: Post Independence Naushera, Zoji La, Khinsar, Madhumati River, Belonia, Khansama and Akhaura

Commanders
- Current commander: Lt General Manoj Kumar Katiyar
- Notable commanders: Field Marshal K. M. Cariappa; General V. K. Singh

Insignia
- Identification symbol: A pair of crossed Rajputi Katars flanked by 3 Ashoka leaves on either side

The Rajput Regiment is one of the oldest infantry regiments of the Indian Army. The regiment traces its history back to 1778, when the 24th Regiment of Bengal Native Infantry was formed. The Regiment's 1st Battalion was later formed in 1798. Its regimental centre consists is located in Fatehgarh, Uttar Pradesh.

Following World War I, the Indian Army underwent a significant restructuring, during which most Rajput regiments were consolidated into the 7th Rajput Regiment. These included the 2nd Queen Victoria's Own, the 4th Prince Albert Victor's, the 7th (Duke of Connaught's Own), and the 11th Rajputs.

Before India's independence, the regiment primarily consisted of Rajputs and Punjabi Muslims. After 1947 recruitment was diversified, but Rajputs continued to form the majority, making up 51% of the regiment’s population. There are also Gujjar, Brahmins, Bengalis and even Muslims. The overall percentage of the Rajputs, however, remains the highest-51 per cent—with Gujars, Bengalis and Muslims trailing behind. such as those of the Jats, Brahmins, Kurmi, Muslims, and Ahirs.

The regimental insignia features a pair of crossed Rajputi Katars flanked by three Ashoka leaves on either side. The Lion Capital of Ashoka is mounted on top, and a scroll below displays the words "The Rajput Regiment".

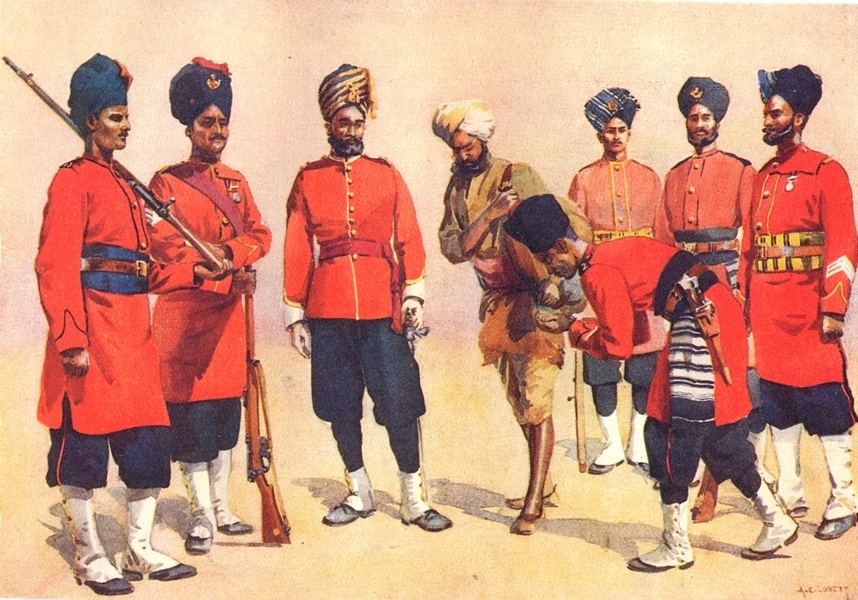
Rajput soldiers of the British Indian Army. Left to right: 13th Rajputs, man and havildar from the 7th Duke of Connaught's Own Rajputs, Subadar and servant from the 16th Rajputs, 8th Rajputs, 11th Rajputs, 2nd Queen's Own Rajput Light Infantry. Water colour by AC Lovett (1911)

== Operations ==
=== World War I ===
Most Rajput battalions actively participated in combat during the World War I. The 1st Battalion fought at the Battle of Dujaila in southern Kut (present-day Iraq) and was nearly annihilated. The 3rd battalion fought the Battles of Qurna and Kut-al-Amara against the Ottoman forces. In one of the battles, the Ottoman Turks had pushed back both flanks of the 3rd Rajput, during which Jemadar Sital Baksh was severely wounded. Sepoy Jhandu Singh rescued him and was posthumously awarded the Indian Order of Merit and Médaille militaire.

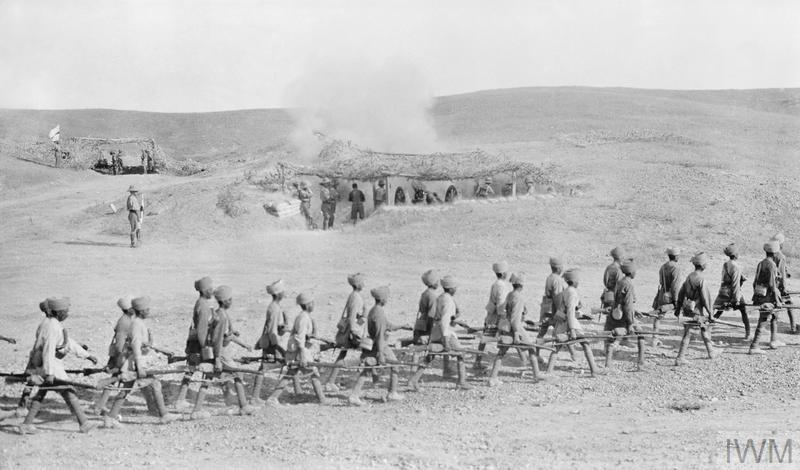
A platoon of the 1/2 Rajputs (51 Brigade, 17th Division) passing a heavy artillery battery in action at Samarra in South of Kut during the First World War

=== Interwar Period ===
In 1922, the infantry regiments of the British Indian Army underwent a reorganization. All Rajput regiments (except the 13th (Shekhawati) Rajput Infantry, which became the 10th battalion of the 6th Rajputana Rifles) were amalgamated to become battalions of the new 7th Rajput Regiment, divided as follows:

- 1st battalion: from 2nd Queen Victoria's Own Rajput Light Infantry (1911–1922) (Note: Formerly known as 2nd Battalion, 15th Bengal Native Infantry (1798–1857), 31st Bengal Native Infantry (1857–1861) 2nd Bengal Native Light Infantry (1861–1876) 2nd (The Queen's Own) Bengal Native Light Infantry (1876–1897) 2nd (The Queen's Own) Rajput Bengal Light Native Infantry (1897–1901) 2nd (The Queen's Own) Rajput Light Infantry (1901–1911))
- 2nd battalion: from 4th Prince Albert Victor's Rajputs (1901–1922) (Note: Formerly the 2nd Battalion, 16th Bengal Native Infantry (1798–1824), 33rd Bengal Native Infantry (1824–1861) 4th Bengal Regiment of Bengal Native Infantry (1861–1890) 4th (Prince Albert Victor's) Bengal Infantry (1890–1897) 4th (Prince Albert Victor's) Rajput Regiment, Bengal Infantry (1897–1901))
- 3rd battalion: from 7th (Duke of Connaught's Own) Rajput Infantry (1903–1922) (Note: 1st Battalion, 24th Bengal Native Infantry (1798–1824), 69th Bengal Native Infantry (1824–1828) 47th Bengal Native Infantry (1828–1861) 7th Bengal Native Infantry (1861–1883) 7th (Duke of Connaught's Own) Bengal Native Infantry (1883–1893) 7th (Duke of Connaught's Own) Rajput Regiment of Bengal Native Infantry (1893–1903))
- 4th battalion: from 8th Rajput Infantry (1901–1922) (Note: Formerly known as 1st Battalion, 30th Bengal Native Infantry (1798–1824), 59th Bengal Native Infantry (1824–1861) 8th Bengal Native Infantry (1861–1897) 8th (Rajput) Bengal Infantry (1897–1901))
- 5th battalion: from 11th Rajput Infantry (1901–1922) (Note: Formerly known as 2nd Extra Battalion, Bengal Native Infantry (1825–1828), 70th Bengal Native Infantry (1828–1861) 11th Bengal Native Infantry (1861–1885) 11th Bengal Infantry (1885–1897) 11th (Rajput) Bengal Infantry (1897–1901))
- 10th (Training) battalion: from the 16th Rajput Infantry (The Lucknow Regiment) (1901–1922) (Note: Formerly known as Regiment of Lucknow, 16th Bengal Native Infantry (1861–1864), 16th (The Lucknow) Bengal Native Infantry (1864–1885), 16th (The Lucknow) Bengal Infantry (1885–1897), 16th (The Lucknow) Rajput Bengal Infantry (1897–1901))

Additionally, the one-class characteristics of most infantry regiments were altered, and the Rajputs introduced a company comprising each of Punjabi Muslims and Indian Muslims in each of their battalions.

In late 1936 and 1937, the 3rd Battalion (3/7 Rajput) was posted to Waziristan, now part of the tribal areas of Pakistan. During that time, they were employed against Afghan insurgents and criminal gangs raiding across the border.

=== World War II ===
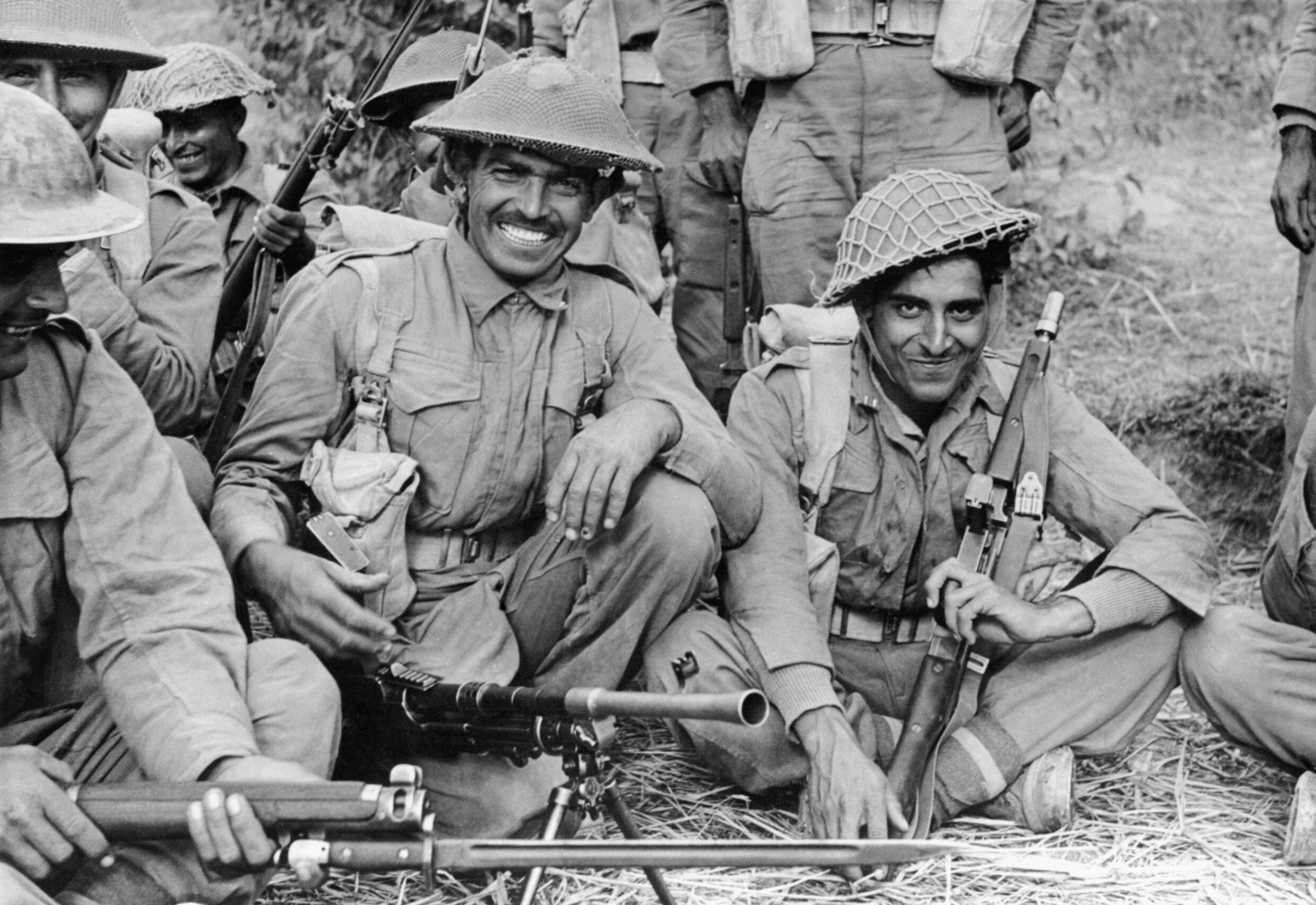
An infantry section of the 2nd battalion, 7th Rajput Regiment about to go on patrol on the Arakan front, 1944.

The 1st Battalion was in the Arakan during the Burma campaign and later took over the defense of the Andaman & Nicobar Islands.

The 2nd Battalion was also in the Arakan area, and it fought a number of battles. The capture of Point 551, also known as Rajput Hill, was the most significant. The Japanese forces holding this feature had repelled attacks by other battalions, but the Rajputs captured the hill, winning an Indian Order of Merit, five Military Crosses, and two Military Medals for this action.

The 3rd Battalion was shipped by convoy to Egypt in August and September 1940. Their convoy was attacked several times by Italian bombers operating out of Ethiopia. The battalion's Bren guns were deployed for air defense, and on one occasion, they are believed to have brought down an Italian aircraft. The battalion was stationed at Suez, Egypt, and was deployed to defend Cyprus following the German attack on Crete, as part of the Indian 5th Infantry Division's 161st Indian Infantry Brigade. Here, they were mainly used in an anti-parachute role, supported by Australian armor. Later, they returned to Egypt and participated in fierce fighting around Deir el Shein and Ruweisat Ridge, including a tough offensive on the 21st and 22 July 21 and 22, 1942, during which they suffered many casualties, including the loss of their commanding officer. On 6 August, Sikandar Hayat Khan, Premier of the Punjab, visited the battalion and, having inspected the P.M.s of the battalion, addressed them. He spoke mainly about what the Indian Army had done and was doing, and also generally about the condition in Punjab. Later in the year, the battalion participated in the Second Battle of El Alamein.

The 4th Battalion was also involved in the Western Desert campaign at Sidi Barrani and El Alamein, and upon its return to India, was posted to the Kohima front.

The 5th battalion fought in the Battle of Hong Kong. The action against the invading Japanese was short, with the battalion taking heavy casualties. The battalion, along with the British garrison, was forced to surrender, and the men became prisoners of war and had to undergo great hardships. 130 men of the 5/7 Rajput were either beaten or starved to death, or died because of a lack of medical care. The Japanese wanted Capt. Mateen Ahmed Ansari of the battalion to renounce his allegiance to the British, but he refused. For five months, he was subjected to brutal beatings and treatment, as a result of which he could not walk. He was then sent to live with the other ranks instead of the officers. Capt. Ansari remained true to the regiment and organized a system to assist escapees. He was again put in jail, tortured for his actions, and executed after refusing to give in. Capt. Ansari was awarded the George Cross for his sacrifice.

=== 1947-48 Jammu & Kashmir Operations ===
At the time of partition in 1947, the Punjabi and Bengali Muslims, who comprised up to 50% of the strength in most battalions, were transferred to the Pakistani Army. The vacancies created by their departure were filled by Gurjars, who were transferred from the Punjab Regiments that had been allotted to Pakistan. The numeral prefix "(7)" was subsequently removed from the regiment's name, and it became known as the Rajput Regiment.

Four Rajput battalions (1st, 2nd, 3rd, and 4th) participated in the 1947–48 operations in Jammu & Kashmir. 3 Rajput was the first to be inducted. Its original task was to protect Ramban and Jammu, but it quickly came under the 50th Parachute Brigade for the relief of Jhangar and Kotli. The advance from Jhangar to Kotli took five days, as the column had to clear 47 roadblocks. After the relief of Kotli, the column returned to Naushera. The 1st Battalion Rajput was inducted next and it formed part of the 50th Parachute Brigade at Naushera. It had its share of fighting in clearing the raiders from some hill features around Naushera. Meanwhile, the raiders maintained heavy pressure on the Naushera-Jhangar road, and both the 1st and 3rd Rajput Battalions fought numerous engagements to keep the road open. In December 1947, 4th Battalion Rajput troops were inducted and deployed in the Chamb-Akhnoor area. 2 Rajput came in next and were employed for lines of communication duties around Jammu.

Aggressive patrolling was conducted by the 1st and 3rd Rajput Battalions around Naushera and Kot. In February 1948, a patrol was dispatched to the area east of Naushera, where it encountered and was surrounded by an enemy force of around 1,000 men. A fierce battle ensued, lasting for seven hours. In this action, the 3 Rajputs won 3 Vir Chakras – one each to Sub. Gopal Singh and Sep. Sikdar Singh and a posthumous one to Hav. Mahadeo Singh.

After the fall of Jhangar, Naushera became the enemy's next objective. Brig. Mohammad Usman, the commander of the 50th Parachute Brigade, closely monitored the situation and drew up defensive plans in which the Rajputs were holding tactical ground around Naushera. C Company, 1 Rajput was holding the Taindhar position, which was vital for the defence of Naushera. Brig. Usman had directed C Company to hold this position at any cost in case of an attack. In the early morning hours of 6 February 1948, the enemy attacked the Taindhar position. Enemy forces were about 1500 strong and mainly consisted of Pathans with some Pakistani servicemen. The enemy attacked in waves of lines, each comprising 200–300 men. Six such attacks were launched, and there was heavy hand-to-hand fighting in some posts. Hav. Daya Ram, who was then manning the 3-inch mortar detachment, realised that the enemy had gotten very close to the defensive positions. He removed the secondary charge from the mortar bombs, elevated the mortars to their maximum height, and fired the bombs. These bombs landed within 30–50 yards of the Rajput defensive positions and caused havoc among the enemy. Some of the enemies switched and attacked Daya Ram's section, but the position held. Daya Ram was wounded, and his Bren gunner was killed. He then picked up the Bren gun and started firing at the enemy. For his courageous actions, Daya Ram was awarded the Maha Vir Chakra.

The left flank of C Company gave a straightforward approach to the enemy. This sector was defended by Nk. Jadunath Singh and his section. The enemy, after failing in its frontal attacks, shifted its main effort to this sector. Jadunath Singh effectively directed the fire of his Bren gun, rifles, and grenades. The enemy, however, still continued to advance. Jadunath Singh rushed out of his defensive position, throwing hand grenades and firing his Sten gun, taking the enemy by surprise and forcing them to withdraw to regroup. The enemy charged again, but Jadunath Singh stood firm and charged out once more. He was wounded this time, but the attack failed again. By this time, his section had suffered heavy casualties. The enemy attacked again, and Jadunath Singh charged out for the third time, firing his Sten gun and hurling grenades. He fell after being hit by two bullets, one in the head and another in the chest. The enemy had lost heart after this and withdrew, leaving behind a large number of dead and wounded. For his gallantry, Jadunath Singh was posthumously awarded the Param Vir Chakra.

=== 1962 Sino-Indian War ===
Two Rajput battalions experienced intense fighting in the North-East Frontier Agency (NEFA) in 1962. The 2nd Rajput Battalion, under the command of Lt. Col. M.S. Rikh, was stationed at Walong in early 1962 and was relocated to the banks of the Namka Chu river by the 10th October as part of the 7th Infantry Brigade. The brigade was stretched out on a twelve-mile front along the Namka Chu, with a marching time of five days from one end to the other. The site chosen for their defences was forced upon them by the corps commander, who was working directly with the political authorities instead of the military chain of command. The battalion took up hastily erected defensive positions along the Namka Chu. The battalion was deployed in a trackless wilderness, where no mules could go and no civilian population lived. Lack of winter clothing added to the difficulties. By the time the fighting commenced, Chinese forces had occupied all the heights in the area. A massive assault came on the Rajput front and in the fierce fighting that ensured, the battalion repulsed a number of determined attacks. The positions were soon enveloped from both sides and the battalion was cut off.

At the temporary bridge, Naik Roshan Singh's section maintained its position till every man was killed. Subedar Dasrath Singh's platoon was reduced to seven men and had exhausted its ammunition in repulsing three Chinese attacks. When the fourth Chinese attack came the Rajputs fixed bayonets and charged. In the ensuing hand-to-hand fighting four men were killed and the three survivors all seriously wounded were captured. Jemadar Bose's platoon was left with only 10 men after halting three Chinese attacks. The platoon then fixed bayonets and charged. He along with most of his platoon were killed.

Major B.K. Pant's company held fast against three waves of Chinese assaults and had suffered heavy casualties. Pant himself was wounded in the stomach and legs, yet he continued to lead his men, exhorting them to fight till the end to the last man. The Chinese forces, realizing that Major Pant was the key obstacle to capturing 2 Rajput's position, they unleashed a barrage of machine-gun fire towards his position, killing him instantly. His last words were "Men of the Rajput Regiment, you were born to die for your country. God has selected this small river for which you must die. Stand up and fight like true Rajputs." He died shouting the Rajput war cry, "Bajrang Bali ki Jai". Major Pant's company of 112 men had 82 killed and wounded.

No one from B, C or D Companies was awarded any gallantry medal, as there was no one left to write the citations, because there was no officer who was not killed or seriously wounded and taken POW. When the commanding officer, Lt. Col. M.S. Rikh was released from the POW camp, he wrote up the citations but the Indian government and Ministry of Defence did not act upon them. There is a memorial erected to those who fought at Namka Chu, which is a tin shed with names still missing from it and names of people who were not present there have been put up.

Out of 513 all ranks of 2nd Battalion Rajput in battle, 282 were killed and 81 were wounded and captured. 90 others were taken prisoners when they tried to break out. Only 60 other ranks, mostly from the administrative elements, got back.

4th Battalion Rajput under Lt. Col. B. Avasthi was in the Sela-Bomdila area and it too had to face heavy odds. There were conflicting views among the senior commanders. The brigade commander wanted to hold Sela, but the divisional commander wanted to fall back. The divisional commander and the corps commander both agreed to withdraw. This led to total chaos during the retreat as the Chinese had bypassed many positions and ambushed parties of the soldiers withdrawing in a number of places. The battalion broke up into a number of parties, one led by Lt. Col. Avasti was ambushed, and he was killed along with 300 men.

=== 1965 Indo-Pakistani War ===
After the Rann of Kutch affair, Pakistan switched its efforts towards capturing Kargil and in May 1965 it attacked one of the Indian posts there. 4th Battalion Rajput as a part of 121 Infantry Brigade were ordered to capture Point 13620 and Black Rock (15000), also known as Kargil heights, to remove any threat to the Srinagar-Leh highway. Both posts consisted of three parts and each of these features was held by a platoon plus of the enemy in addition to a section of 3" mortars and MMGs on Point 13620. On 17 May 1965, B Company under Maj. Baljit Singh Randhawa infiltrated deep behind the enemy held posts and attacked them. A grim battle was subsequently fought and the Rajputs were successful in evicting their enemy. Maj. Randhawa was killed in the action and was posthumously awarded a Maha Vir Chakra. 3 Vir Chakras were also awarded to the company, one each to Capt. Ranbir Singh, Sepoy Budh Singh and a posthumous one to Havildar Girdhari Lal. Black Rock was captured by A Company in the second phase of the attack. As an act of goodwill, in order to aid negotiations, these posts were handed back to Pakistani control some weeks later. These were again recaptured by another battalion in August 1965.

In August, 4th Battalion Rajput were moved to the Hajipir area and Bisali feature was captured by them on the night of 4/5 September. This assault was carried out in face of heavy MMG, mortar and artillery fire. Pakistani forces launched five counterattacks and all these were beaten back. By this time the Rajputs had nearly exhausted all of their ammunition and with no hope of reinforcements, they had to withdraw to other defensive positions.

6th Battalion Rajput were in and around Srinagar dealing with Pakistani infiltrators. A number of raids and ambushes were systematically carried out by them. After the number of infiltrator incidents had fallen, 6th Battalion Rajput moved to the Akhnoor area and came under 191 Infantry Brigade, which in turn was directly under HQ 15 corps. The battalion was supplied with RCL guns but without sights. When asking for the sights they were told to "see through the barrels and engage the Pakistani armour". The battalion held on to a number of forward posts in the area in the face of repeated counterattacks and heavy shelling.

14 and 20 Rajput were at the Phillora-Chawinda front and after the capture of Charwa on the border, 20 Rajput led the advance for the next 10 days. 17 Rajput were in the southern Lahore sector in the Bedian area.

=== 1971 Indo-Pakistani War ===
Rajput battalions played an active part in the Indo-Pakistani War of 1971. Starting in West Bengal, near Calcutta and going about in a clockwise direction around Bangladesh the battalions were deployed as follows.

22nd Battalion Rajput soldiers captured Akanda Baria and cleared the way to capture Darshana. It then led the brigade attack on Kushtia. Pakistani forces had built up the area around Kushtia and they let the Rajputs and the supporting tanks come forward into the area. They then opened up with heavy fire, and the leading company of the Rajputs suffered heavy casualties.

16th Battalion Rajput participated in the Battle of Hilli, advancing to Ghoraghat and then on to Rangpur. 21st Battalion Rajput spearheaded the move to Saidpur and fought in the battle of Panchagarh and Khansama during which there was fierce hand-to-hand fighting. The 4th Battalion Rajput were in the area of Kurigram – Kaliganj -Jaipurhat. 6th Battalion Rajput fought in the Sylhet area and led the advance towards Fenchuganj and Kola Bills. Heavy fighting took place at Kola Bills and the battalion suffered 90-100 casualties, but it obtained the surrender of the Pakistan Army's 22nd battalion, Baloch Regiment. The battalion was awarded one Vir Chakra (posthumous) and 2 Sena Medals for the action at Kola Bills.

18th Battalion Rajput were stationed on the Akhaura-Ashuganj axis. Akhaura proved a difficult target, and fighting for it took nearly three days. After this the Rajputs rushed forward and captured the Titas bridge intact. They then attacked Ashuganj, which was cleared after a tough fight and moved on to Narsingdi and entered Dhaka on 16 December. 2nd Battalion Rajput operated in the Belonia bulge and captured Chauddagram and later moved to Chittagong.

On the western front, 20th Battalion Rajput were deployed to Rajasthan. After covering a distance of 70 km in the first five days of the war, the Rajputs reached Chachro. 15th Battalion Rajput was in the Fazilka area. It was involved in heavy fighting for the capture of Beriwala bridge and the Ghazi post. It suffered heavy casualties during the attacks. Lance Naik Drigpal Singh received a posthumous Maha Vir Chakra for his gallant actions. 14th Battalion Rajput saw action in the Khalra sector and 5th Battalion and 9th Battalion Rajputs were in the Chamb area. 9th Battalion Rajput operated in the Ratnu Chak area and carried out a number of raids, they also captured two enemy posts.

=== 1980 – present ===
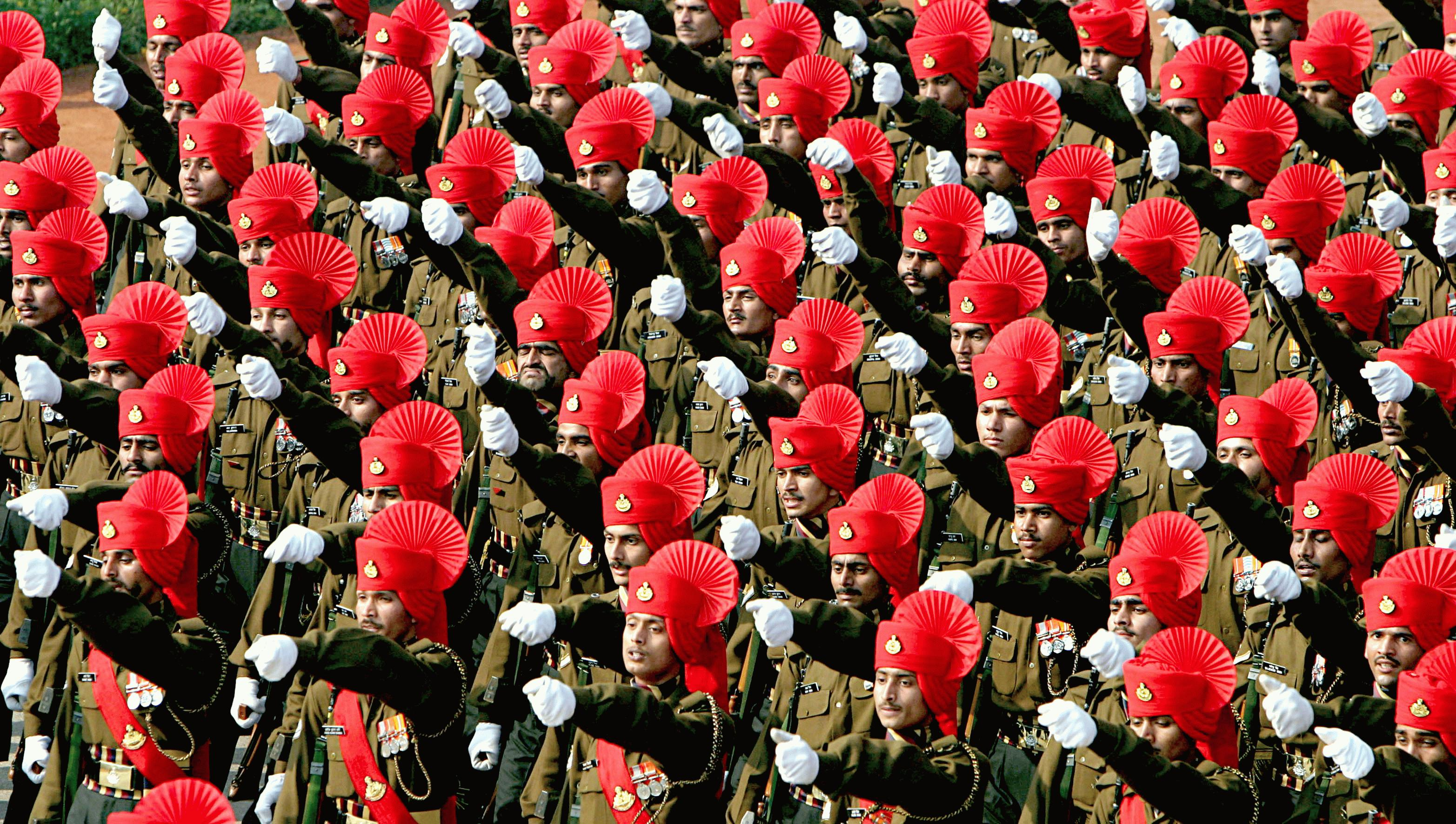
A Rajput Regiment contingent during a Republic Day parade.

Since the 1980s several Rajput battalions have been involved in counterinsurgency operations in the North East, Punjab and Jammu and Kashmir. 4th Battalion, 5th Battalion and 25th Battalion Rajput formed a part of Indian Peacekeeping Force in Sri Lanka. In 1980, 18th Battalion Rajput transferred to the newly raised Mechanised Infantry Regiment as its 13th battalion. The 27th battalion of the regiment was raised at Fatehgarh, Uttar Pradesh, in 1988. Its motto is Sarvada Sarv Shersht. 27th Battalion Rajput troops were involved in operations during the Kargil War in 1999 and captured Point 5770. After the Kargil War the battalion moved to Ethiopia and Eritrea as a part of a United Nations Mission (UNMEE).

The Rajput Regimental center is in Fatehgarh, Uttar Pradesh. A war memorial was erected at Fatehgarh in 1932. It is in a form of a chattri, with its dome resting on six pillars, each representing a battalion at that time and bearing its crest. The regimental motto is 'Sarvatra Vijaya' which means 'Victory Everywhere' and the war cry is 'Bol Bajrang Bali Ki Jai' meaning 'Victory to Lord Hanuman.'

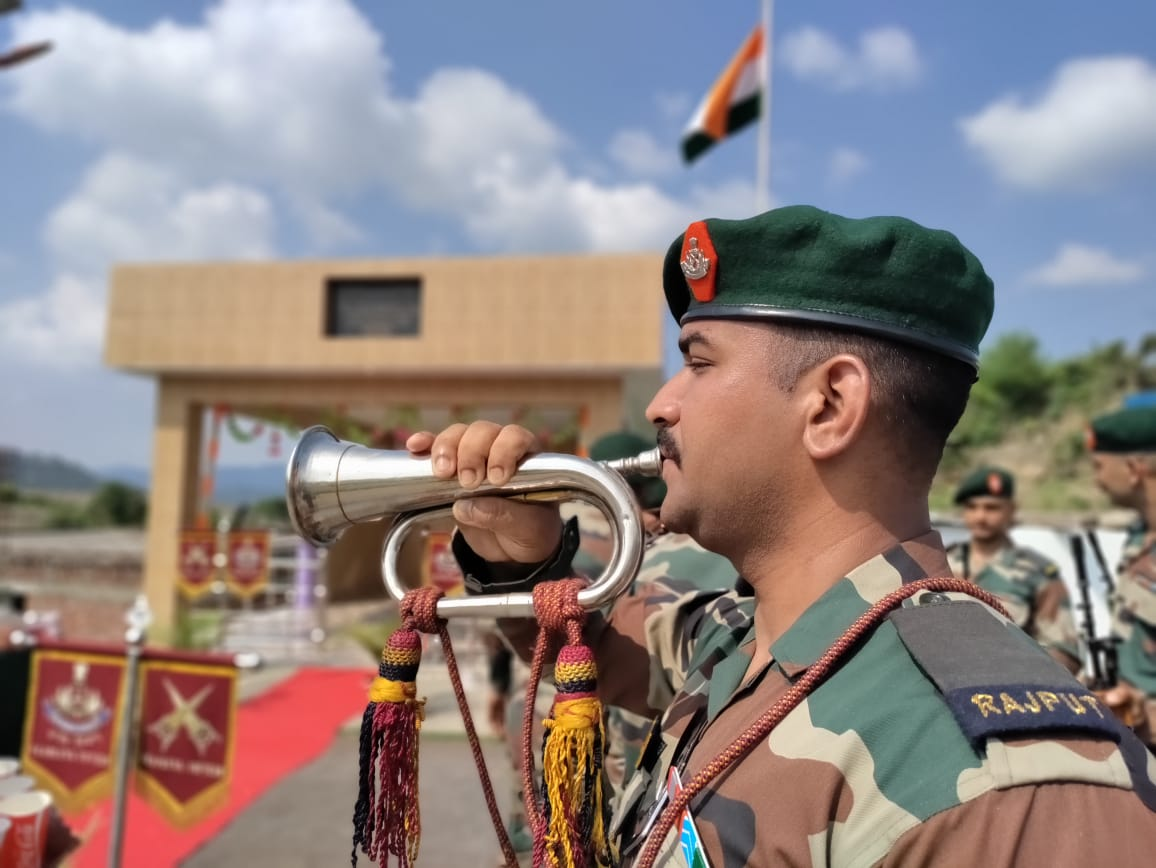
A soldier of the Rajput Regiment during a wreath laying ceremony at Rajouri.

== Gallantry awards ==
The honours and awards tally for the Rajput Regiment are as follows:

- Pre-Independence: 1 Victoria Cross, 1 George Cross, 10 Distinguished Service Order, 33 Military Cross, 10 Indian Order of Merit, 27 Military Medals and 46 Indian Distinguished Service Medals.
- Post-Independence: 1 Param Vir Chakra, 3 Ashoka Chakras, 7 Maha Vir Chakras, 15 Kirti Chakras, 66 Vir Chakras, 20 Shaurya Chakras, 313 Sena Medals and 8 Yudh Seva Medals.

== Affiliation ==
The affiliation between Indian Navy ships and Indian Army regiments was instituted in 1990 when the guided missile destroyer INS Rajput was affiliated to the Rajput Regiment. The ship was decommissioned from service on 21 May 2021.

== See also ==
- List of regiments of the Indian Army
- Indian Army
- Armed Forces of India
- British Indian Army
- British Army
- Rajputs
- INS Rajput
- History of Rajputs
