= Edward Ommanney =

Edward Ommanney CSI
- Born: 24 August 1834; Cherrapunji, Assam, British Raj
- Died: 3 April 1914 (aged 79); Woolwich
- Relatives: Major General Edward Lacon Ommanney
- Military career
- Allegiance: British
- Branch: 59th Bengal Native Infantry
- Rank: Colonel
- Conflicts: Indian Mutiny of 1857

Colonel Edward Lacon Ommanney CSI (24 August 1834 - 3 April 1914) was a British military officer active in India during the British Raj.

He was born in Cherrapunji, Assam the son of Major General Edward Lacon Ommanney. He was the nephew of Erasmus Ommanney. He was educated at Bedford Grammar School, Civil Engineering College, Putney, Owens College, Manchester. He arrived in India in 1852 and was posted to the Opium Department. In 1855 he joined the Bengal Army and commissioned into the 59th Bengal Native Infantry. In 1861 he was transferred to the Staff Corps, rising to the rank of colonel in 1885.

He served during the Indian Mutiny of 1857 and was appointed to the charge of Bahadur Shah II, his family and other state prisoners in the aftermath. He escorted the former emperor and his family to Rangoon and was transferred to the Pegu Commission. In 1859 he relinquished charge of the prisoners and joined the Punjab commission. During his time in the Punjab, he served as personal assistant to the commissioner of Peshawar and Derajat, and took part in the Black Mountain Expedition of 1868. In 1880 he was appointed commissioner of the Multan, Derajat and Peshawar Divisions. He accompanied the 2nd Black Mountain Expedition as chief political officer in 1888.

He returned to England in 1891 and died in Woolwich on 3 April 1914.
