= 2nd Queen Victoria's Own Rajput Light Infantry =

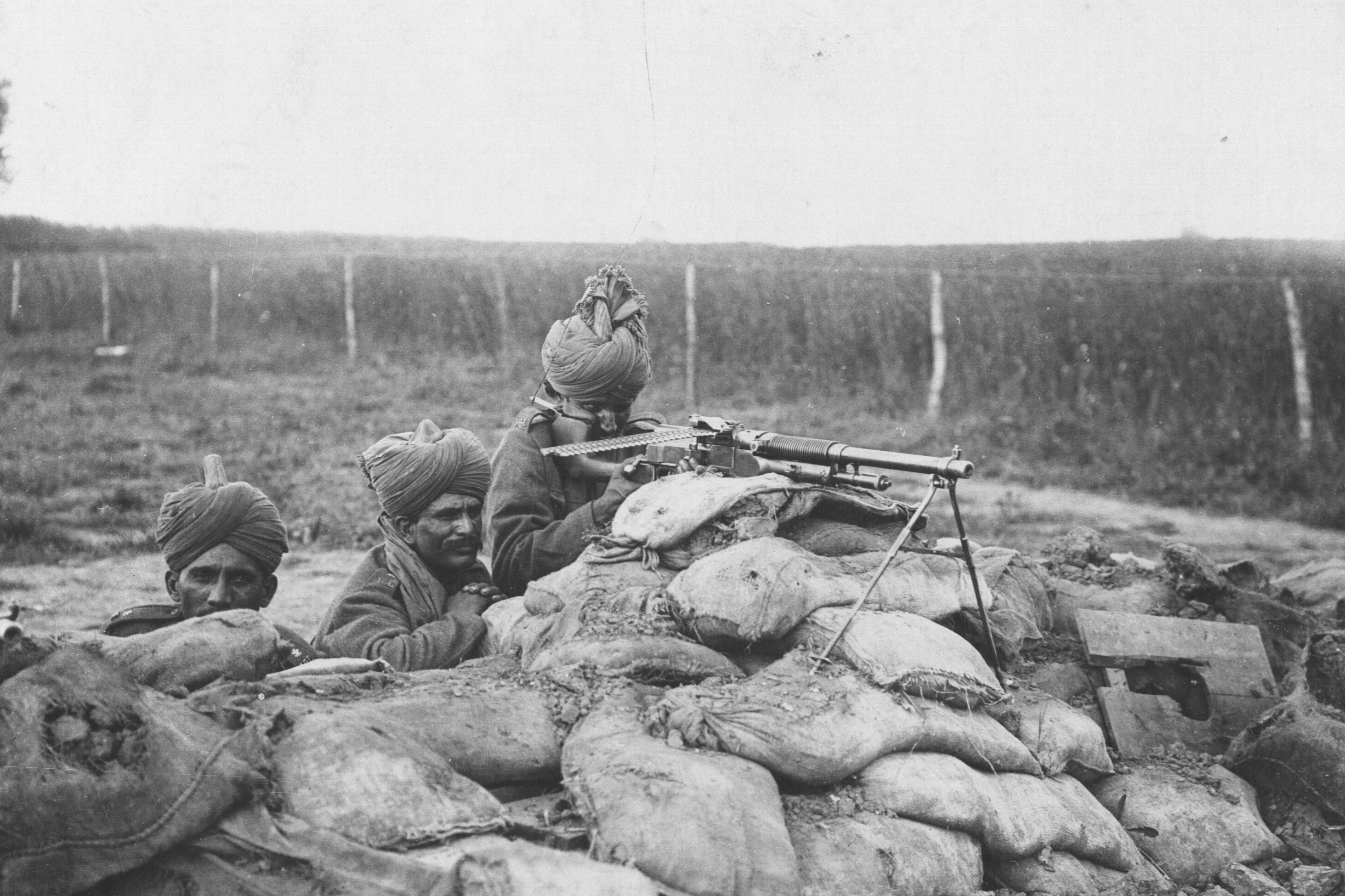
- A Benet-Mercier machine gun section of 2nd Rajput Light Infantry in action in Flanders, during the winter of 1914-15
- Active: 1798-1922
- Country: Indian Empire
- Branch: Army
- Type: Infantry
- Part of: Bengal Army (to 1895), Bengal Command
- Colors: Red; faced buff, 1879 blue.
- Engagements: Delhi; Laswaree; Deig; 1825 - 26 Bhurtpore; Khelet; 1838 - 42 Afghanistan; Maharajpore; 1849 Punjab; Chillianwallah; Goojerat; Central India; 1879 - 80 Afghanistan; 1885 - 87 Burma; 1900 China

Commanders
- Colonel-in-Chief: King Edward VII (1904)
- Colonel of the Regiment: Brigadier-General F. A. Smith (1921)

The 2nd Queen Victoria's Own Rajput Light Infantry, commonly shortened to 2nd Rajputs, was a regiment of the British Indian Army. Raised in 1798, it was amalgamated with five other Rajput regiments in 1922.

== History ==
The British East India Company raised a 2nd Battalion for the 15th Regiment of Bengal Native Infantry (BNI) in 1798. As such, it fought at Delhi, Laswari, Deeg, and Bharatpur. For its service under General Lake during the Second Anglo-Maratha War, the battalion was granted an honorary colour; an additional jemadar was employed on its strength to carry it.

The battalion was separated from the 15th in 1828, to form the 31st Bengal Native Infantry. Its first campaign as a regiment was in 1839, in the First Anglo-Afghan War. The regiment fought at Kalat, a fortress captured on 13 November. Three battle honours were awarded during the Second Anglo-Sikh War, two for the battles of Chillianwala and Gujarat.

In the Indian rebellion of 1857, the regiment did not mutiny and fought in the Central India Campaign, holding a Sangor fort under attack for six months. The Governor General described the regiment as showing unexampled fidelity during this period. Almost the entire Bengal Army had mutinied and in the ensuing disbandment of its regiments, the 31st became the second most senior. When Queen Victoria became Empress of India in 1876, the regiment became the 2nd (Queen's Own) Regiment of Bengal Native Light Infantry. The regimental badge worn until 1923 comprised a brass bugle with the number 2 between the strings.

The regiment later served in the Second Afghan War and contributed to the international force that intervened in the Boxer Rebellion of 1900. Two additional battalions were raised during the First World War, the 2nd in 1917 and the 3rd in 1918. The regiment served in Egypt, Mesopotamia, and Afghanistan.

Reorganisation of the Indian Army in 1922 resulted in its amalgamation with the 4th, 7th, 8th, 11th, and 16th Rajputs, to form the 7th Rajput Regiment. The 2nd Rajputs, upon becoming the 1st Battalion, retained its title, albeit as a subtitle. After India's independence, the battalion was elevated to "Guard" status and transferred to the Brigade of the Guards as its 4th Battalion.

== Notable members of the regiment ==
- Field Marshal Kodandera Madappa Cariappa
- Field Marshal Sir Henry Wylie Norman
- General Sir Cyril Dupré Noyes
- Major-General Corrie Hudson

== Battle honours ==
Delhi 1803, Laswaree, Deig, Bhurtpore, Khelat. Afghanistan, Maharajpore, Punjaub, Chillianwallah, Goojerat, Central India, Afghanistan 1879-80, Burma 1885-87, China 1900
