= James Henry Lawrence-Archer =

British soldier

James Henry Lawrence Archer or Lawrence-Archer (28 July 1823 – 14 February 1889) was a British soldier, collector of botanical specimens, and author best known for his guide to the Monumental Inscriptions of the British West Indies.

== Early life ==
James Henry Lawrence Archer (his surname also given as Lawrence-Archer) was born in 1823, son of James Henry Archer (b. 1798), MD, and Mary, third daughter of Alexander Edgar, of a Lanarkshire family; the name "Lawrence" came from his mother's family, her grandmother, Rachael, being daughter of Lawrence Lawrence, who Lawrence-Archer claimed to be related to the Lawrence baronets of Iver, Buckinghamshire. The Archer family were Scottish armigers, and Lawrence-Archer had maternal ancestors resident in Jamaica.

== Career ==
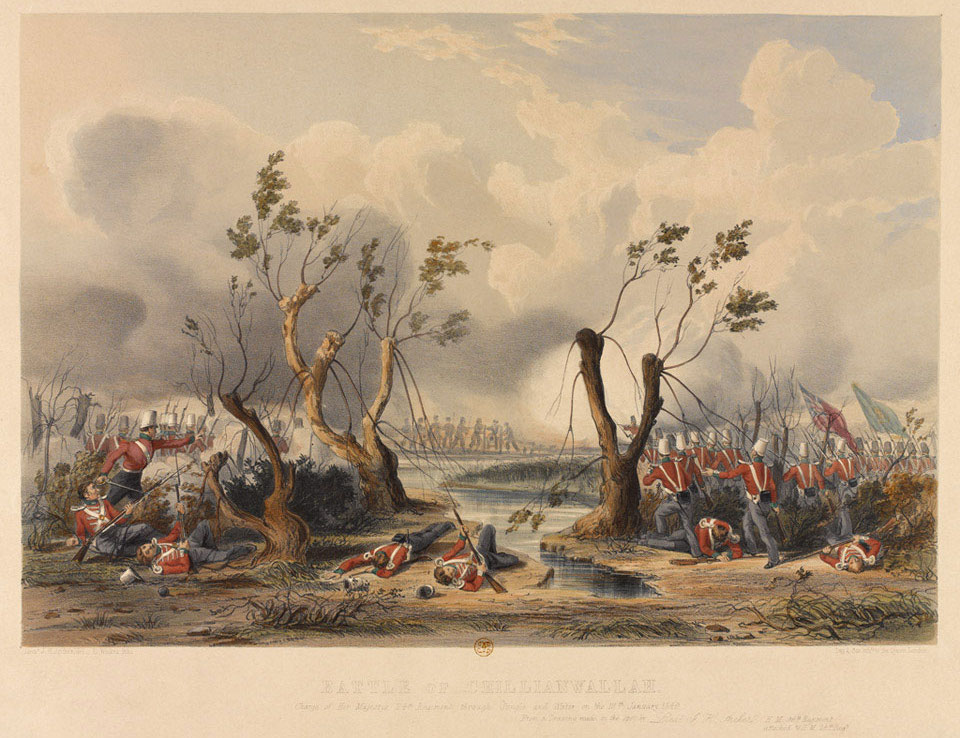
Battle of Chillianwallah. Charge of H.M. 24th Regiment through jungle and water, 13 January 1849, lithograph by Edmund Walker, after J.H. Archer, as he was then known.

Lawrence-Archer was gazetted second lieutenant in the 39th Regiment in 1840, later serving with the 24th Regiment during the Second Anglo-Sikh War from 1848 to 1849. He was in service at the Battle of Chillianwallah, where he was wounded, and present at the Battle of Gujarat.

He served with the 60th King's Royal Rifle Corps, being gazetted captain in 1855, and went on half-pay with the rank in 1869; later holding the rank of major, he remained on the half-pay list until his death.

He collected botanical specimens during his military service, such as the seeds from China that he offered to William Jackson Hooker, director of the Royal Botanic Gardens, Kew, along with other botanical samples that he had personally collected in Mauritius, Anjer, Ascension and St Vincent.

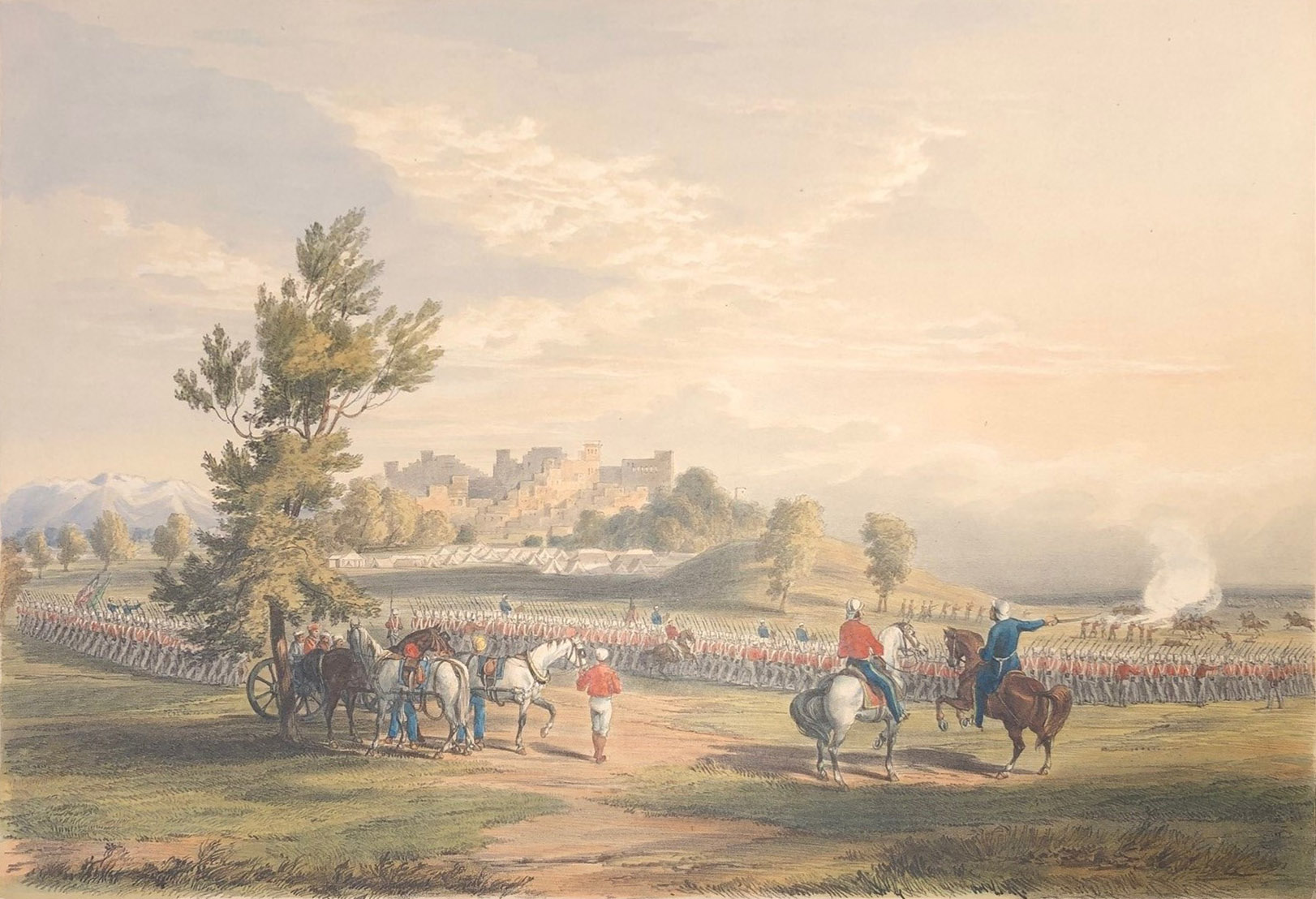
Battle of Guzrat, 21st Feb 1849, another lithograph from a sketch by Archer

As an author he is best known for his guide to the Monumental Inscriptions of the British West Indies. A branch of the Archer family were resident first in Barbados and then in Jamaica.

== Death and legacy ==
Lawrence-Archer died at Umberslade Parva in Warwickshire on 14 February 1889. His address was also given as Bedford Park, Chiswick, now in London. He left an estate of £100. A prolific correspondent, letters from Lawrence-Archer are held by a number of archives, including Kew Gardens, the National Library of Scotland, the University of California and the British Library which holds his genealogical notes on West Indian families.

== Selected publications ==
- Lawrence-Archer, James Henry (1856). Brief Memorials of English Families of the Name of Archer. Edinburgh: John Russell Smith.
- Lawrence-Archer, James Henry (1857). The Indian Mutinies Accounted For: Being an Essay on the Subject. London: Ward & Co.
- Lawrence-Archer, James Henry (1873). An Account of the Sirname Edgar: And Particularly of the Family of Wedderlie in Berwickshire. London: J. C. Hotten.
- Lawrence-Archer, James Henry (1875). Monumental Inscriptions of the British West Indies from the Earliest Date. London: Chatto and Windus – via HathiTrust.
- Lawrence-Archer, James Henry (1878). Commentaries on the Punjab Campaign, 1848-49: Including Some Additions to the History of the Second Sikh War, from Original Sources]. London: W. H. Allen & Co.
- Lawrence-Archer, James Henry (1885). The Orders of Chivalry, from the Original Statutes of the Various Orders of Knighthood, and Other Sources of Information. London: W. H. Allen and Co.
- Lawrence-Archer, James Henry (1888). The British Army: Its Regimental Records, Badges, Devices, etc. London: G. Bell & Sons.
- Anonymous. "James Henry Archer (period 1840–1856)". Museum of the Manchester Regiment: The Men Behind the Medals.
