= INS Rajput =

List of ins ships with the same or similar names

The following ships of the Indian Navy have been named Rajput:

- INS Rajput (D141) was a R-class destroyer acquired in 1949 from the Royal Navy, where it served in World War II as HMS Rotherham (H09)
- INS Rajput (D51) was the lead vessel of her class of destroyers which was decommissioned in 2021.
