= Dhapdhup massacre =

Dhapdhup massacre ঢাপঢুপ গণহত্যা
- Dhapdhup massacre (Bangladesh)
- Location: Dhapdhup Beel, Panchagarh, Rangpur division, Bangladesh
- Date: April 1971 (UTC+6:00)
- Target: Bengali Hindus
- Attack type: Burst fire, mass murder, massacre
- Weapon: Machine Guns
- Deaths: 3,500 (approx.)
- Perpetrators: Pakistani Army, Razakars

Dhapdhup massacre (Bengali: ঢাপঢুপ গণহত্যা) was a pre-planned massacre of over 3500 Bengali Hindus in the Hindu-majority areas around Islampur and Sukhanpokhari in Boda Upazila in the Panchagarh District of East Pakistan in April 1971 by the occupying Pakistan Army in collaboration with the Razakars during the Bangladesh Liberation War. It is estimated that more than 3,500 Bengali Hindus were killed in the massacre within a few hours.

== Events ==
On getting the news of the indiscriminate killings by the Razakars and the Pakistan Army, the Bengali Hindus in areas around Islampur and Sukhanpokhari gathered at the mango orchard on the banks of the Dhapdhup Beel (Billabong) in Islampur for the onward journey. The armed Forces of Pakistan Army and Razakars chased those who had left after sunrise in the morning, blocking the way and herding them back and gathered those who had taken refuge in the mango orchard. They were then lined up and killed by burst fire from machine guns from behind, and the survivors were stabbed with bayonets. Their bodies were dumped in the lake and some bodies were buried with soil. Males were selectively chosen and killed, while women were raped. Today the widows of Dhapdhup massacre live in the বিধবা পল্লী (Bidhoba Pally, "widow street") in Sukhanpokhari village, which is 500 yards from the site of massacre.

== Aftermath ==
The lake is now famous as the site of the Dhapdhup Massacre. A memorial plaque was erected in 2011 with the financial support of the Panchagarh District Council in collaboration with Deputy Commissioner Banamali Bhowmik.
