= 7th (Duke of Connaught's Own) Rajputs =

- Active: 1798-1922
- Country: Indian Empire
- Branch: Army
- Type: Infantry
- Part of: Bengal Army (to 1895); Bengal Command
- Uniform: Red; faced yellow
- Engagements: Moodkee; Ferozeshah; Aliwal; Sobraon; 1858 - 59 China; 1882 Egypt; 1882 Tel-el-Kebir; 1900 China

Commanders
- Colonel-in-Chief: King Edward VII (1904)

The 7th (Duke of Connaught's Own) Rajputs were an infantry regiment of the Bengal Army, later of the united British Indian Army. They could trace their origins to 1798, when they were the 1st Battalion, 24th Bengal Native Infantry. Over the years the regiment became known by a number of different titles. The 69th Bengal Native Infantry 1824–1828, the 47th Bengal Native Infantry 1828–1861, the 7th Bengal Native Infantry 1861–1883, the 7th (Duke of Connaught's Own) Bengal Native Infantry 1883–1893, the 7th (Duke of Connaught's Own) Rajput Regiment of Bengal Native Infantry 1893–1903 and finally after the Kitchener reforms of the Indian Army when the names of the presidencies were dropped 7th (Duke of Connaught's Own) Rajputs. During this time the regiment took part in the First Anglo-Sikh War, the Second Opium War, the Sudan Campaign, the Boxer Rebellion and World War I. After World War I the Indian government reformed the army moving from single battalion regiments to multi battalion regiments. the 7th (Duke of Connaught's Own) Rajputs now became the 3rd Battalion 7th Rajput Regiment. After India gained its independence this was one of the regiments allocated to the new Indian Army.

== Publications ==
- Rawlinson, H G, The History of the 3rd Battalion 7th Rajput Regiment (Duke of Connaught's Own), Oxford University Press, London, 1941
- Sumner, Ian (2001). The Indian Army 1914-1947. Osprey Publishing. ISBN 1-84176-196-6.
