= 8th Rajputs =

- Active: 1798–1922
- Country: Indian Empire
- Branch: Army
- Type: Infantry
- Part of: Bengal Army (to 1895); Bengal Command
- Uniform: Red faced Saxon green, 1888 white, 1905 yellow
- Engagements: 1838 - 1842 Afghanistan; Sobraon

Commanders
- Colonel-in-Chief: King Edward VII (1904)

The 8th Rajputs was an infantry battalion of the British Indian Army. They could trace their origins to 1798 when they were the 1st Battalion, 30th Bengal Native Infantry. Over the years the regiment became known by a number of different titles. The 59th Bengal Native Infantry 1824–1861, the 8th Bengal Native Infantry 1861–1897, the 8th (Rajput) Bengal Infantry 1897–1901, the 8th Rajput Infantry 1901–1903 and finally the 8th Rajputs after the Kitchener reforms of the Indian Army. During this time the regiment took part in the First Afghan War, the First Anglo-Sikh War and World War I. After World War I the Indian Government reformed the Indian Army again, moving from single battalion regiments to multi battalion regiments. The 8th Rajputs now became the 4th Battalion, 7th Rajput Regiment. After Indian gained independence in 1947, this was one of the regiments allocated to the new Indian Army.
