= Sandhawalia =

Jat clan of present-day India and Pakistan

- Jat Clan
- Location: Amritsar, Pathankot
- Language: Punjabi
- Religion: Sikhism
- Surnames: Sandhawalia

Sandhawalia is a Jat clan of present-day India and Pakistan. (Note: Multiple spelling variations of the clan name exists, such as 'Sindhanwalia', 'Sandhanwalia', 'Sandhavalia', and 'Sandhanvalia'.)

== History ==
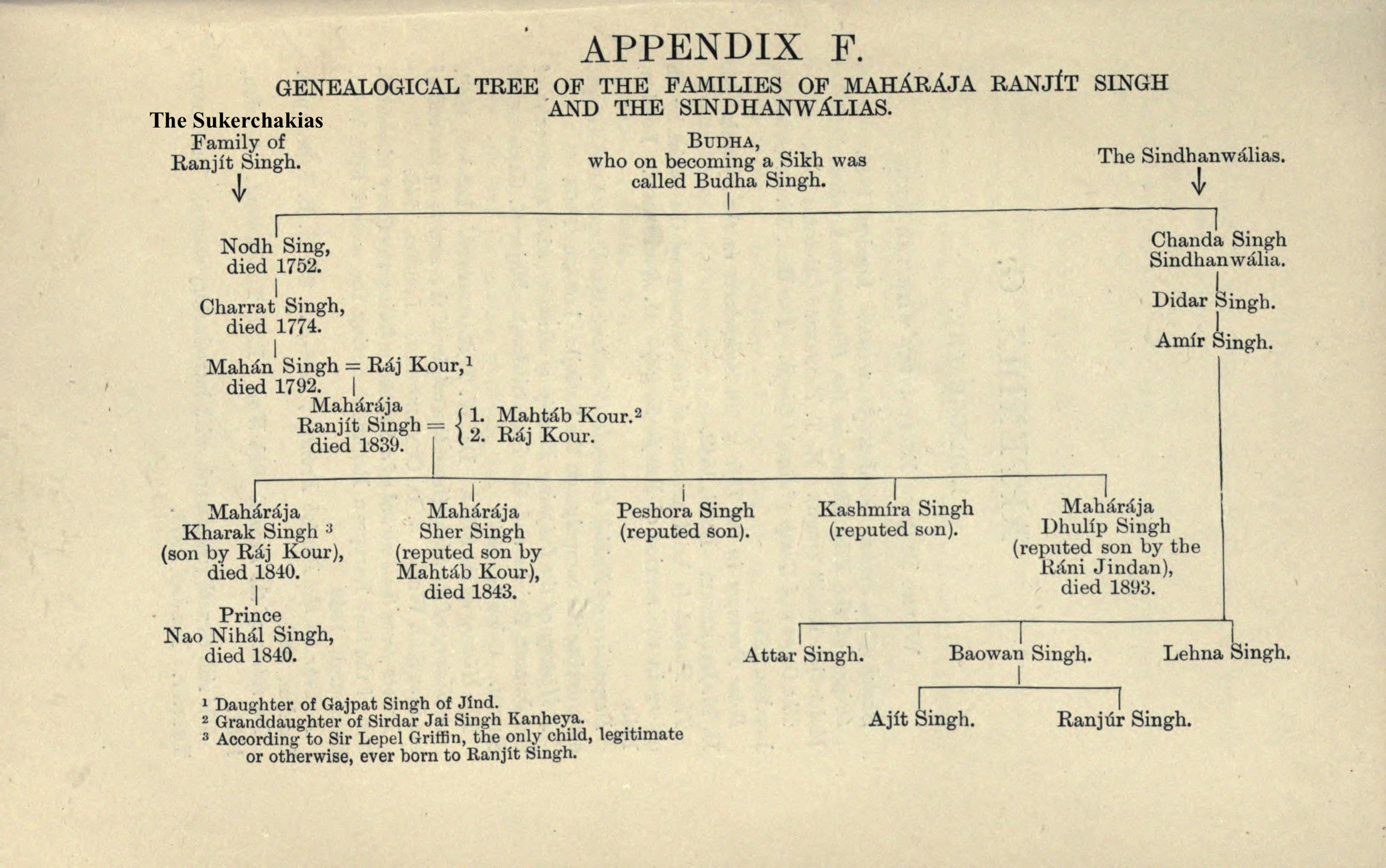
Genealogical Tree of the Families of Maharaja Ranjit Singh and the Sandhanwalias' from 'A Short History of the Sikhs' (1915), by Charles Herbert Payne

The members of one particular Sandhanwalia Jat Sikh family occupied important positions in the Sikh Confederacy. The progenitor of this family was Choudhary Chanda Singh, who settled at the Sandhu wala village in present-day Pakistan, and consequently, came to be known as Sandhanwalia. His sons migrated to Rajasansi. The names of some of the Sandhawalia brothers included Lehna Singh, Basawa Singh, Budh Singh, Attar Singh, and Jaimal Singh.

Maharaja Ranjit Singh, the Sikh ruler of Punjab, has been described as "Jat" in records. This has led to the view that he belonged to the Jat. There are some claims that he was of a lower caste, but according to W. H. McLeod, however, it is more likely that he belonged to the same Jat got ("clan") as the Sandhawalias. Author Preminder Singh Sandhawalia believes that Ranjit Singh shared lineage with the Sandhawalias, although he did not share a direct line of descent with them. Both the Sandhawalias and Sukerchakias share a common ancestor, Budh Singh. Budh Singh was survived by two sons, Naudh Singh and Chanda Singh. Naudh Singh would succeed Budh as head of the Sukerchakia family. Meanwhile, Chanda was the progenitor of the Sandhawalia family of Rajasansi.

After the assassination of Nau Nihal Singh, the Sandhawalia clan supported Chand Kaur to become the ruler. But, when Sher Singh forced Chand Kaur to abdicate the throne, Sandhawalias felt cheated and refused to accept his rule. Sandhawalias were banished from the Khalsa empire and fled to Calcutta in British India.

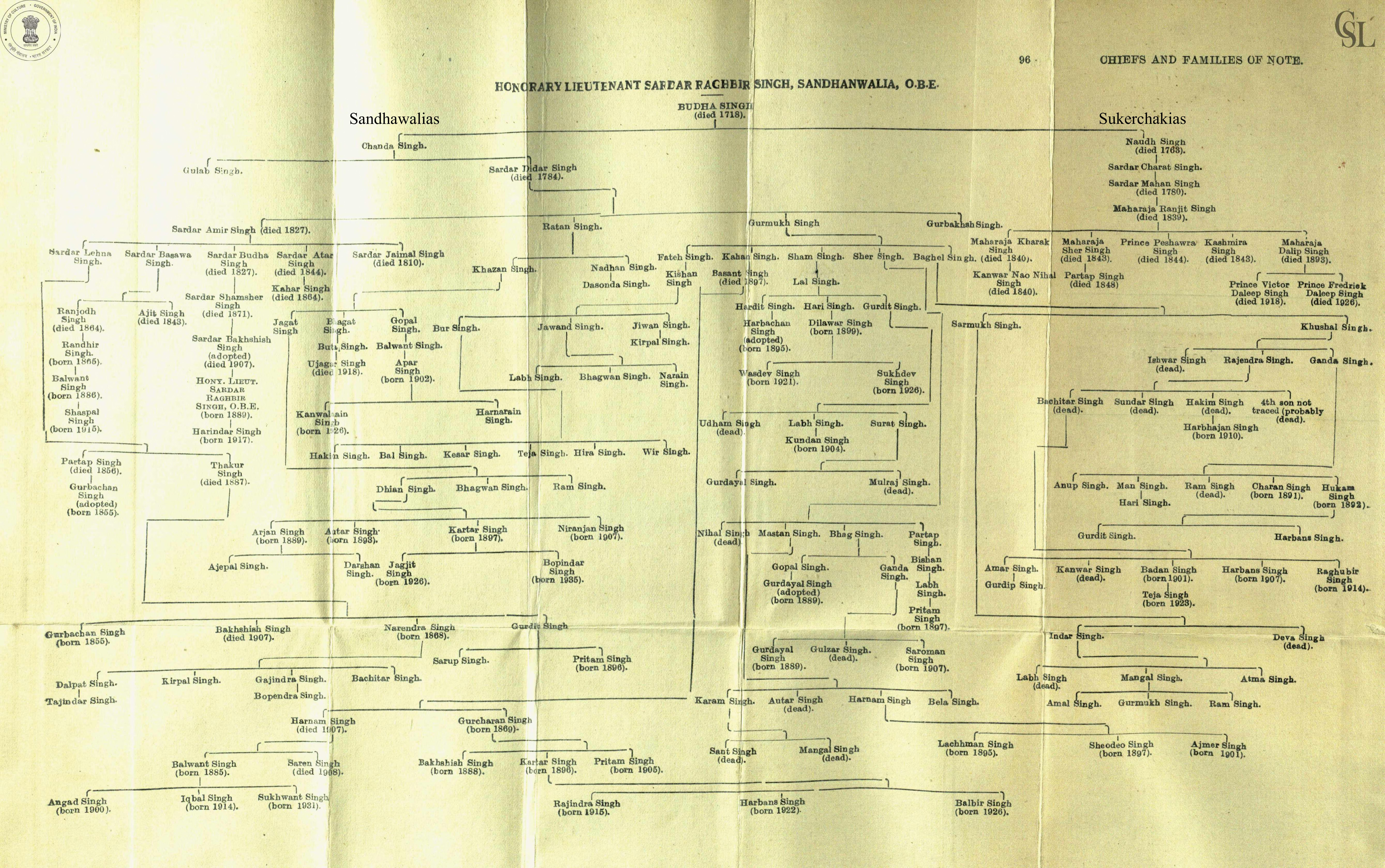
Genealogical pedigree (family-tree) of the Sandhawalia family, Punjab, revised pedigree-table (1940)

Sikh chieftain Ajit Singh Sandhawalia, who had served as Prime Minister first for Ranjit Singh then for Sher Singh's brother Kharak Singh and Karak Singh's son Nau Nihal, assassinated on 15 September 1843 Sher Singh, Maharaja of Sikh Empire, his son and heir apparent Pratap Singh and Sher Singh's wazir (prime minister) Dhian Singh. Sher Singh was killed as he was asked to inspect a new shotgun brought by Sandhawalia. Sandhawalia then pulled the trigger and later beheaded the wounded Sher Singh with his sword.
