= Nanaki Kaur Atariwala =

Queen consort of the Sikh Empire

- Maharani of Sikh Empire; Maharani Sahiba

Maharani consort of Punjab, Kashmir and Jammu
- Tenure: 5 October 1839 – 8 October 1839
- Predecessor: Chand Kaur
- Successor: Prem Kaur
- Born: 1823; Amritsar, Punjab, Sikh Empire
- Died: November 1856 (aged 32–33); Lahore, Punjab, British India
- Spouse: Nau Nihal Singh (m. 1837)
- Issue: Bhagwan Singh (adopted)
- House: Sukerchakia (by marriage)
- Father: Sham Singh Atariwala
- Mother: Dasa Kaur

Nanaki Kaur Atariwala (1823-1856) was the queen consort of Maharaja Nau Nihal Singh, the third Maharaja of the Sikh Empire. She was the daughter of the legendary general Sham Singh Atariwala.

== Early life and marriage ==
Nanaki Kaur was born to Atariwala and his wife, Dasa Kaur. At the age of 14 she was married to 16 year-old Nau Nihal Singh who was second in line of succession to the throne of Punjab. He was the grandson of Maharaja Ranjit Singh and his queen consort, Maharani Datar Kaur and the son of Yuvraj Kharak Singh and Yuvarani Chand Kaur. The wedding was planned by Nau Nihal Singh's grandmother, Datar Kaur, the occasion was marked by a display of extraordinary splendour and lavishness.

== Maharani of the Sikh Empire ==
After the accession of Kharak Singh as the Maharaja, Kunwar Nau Nihal Singh became the Tikka Kanwar (Crown prince) making Nanaki the Tikka Rani Sahiba (Crown princess).

The effect of Chet Singh Bajwa on Kharak Singh started to affect his relationship with the Lahore Darbar as well as his own son. It was decided to kill Chet Singh Bajwa and to divest the Maharaja of all powers and to entrust Sri Tikka Kanwar Nau Nihal Singh with the responsibility of running the administration. From October 8, 1839, Kharak Singh was deprived of all his administrative powers, and all authority passed to Nau Nihal Singh. Thus began his reign. Kharak Singh died on November 5, 1840, and Nau Nihal Singh met a fatal accident on the very day of his father's cremation and died.

During the reign of Nau Nihal Singh, the young couple adopted a son, Jaswinder Singh from the Kanhaiya Misl so when Nau Nihal proclaims himself the Maharaja they have someone in the line of succession.

Her official rule as the Maharani of the Sikh Empire lasted only a day.

After the coronation of Sher Singh, as the fourth maharaja his first wife, Prem Kaur became the Maharani consort.

== Later life ==
After the death of Kharak Singh and Nau Nihal Singh, Chand Kaur claimed the throne as the second wife of Nau Nihal Singh, Rani Sahib Kaur, was pregnant. On 2 December 1840 Chand Kaur was proclaimed Maharani of the Punjab, with the title Malika Muqaddasa (Empress Immaculate) and became the only female ruler the Sikh Empire. Sher Singh whose claim to the throne was supported by Dhian Singh Dogra left the capital after she gained complete control of the administration together with her supporters. But Sher Singh still had the support of the army and in 1841 he arrived in Lahore and secured a ceasefire. She was persuaded to accept a jagir and relinquish her claim to the throne and retired to her late son's palace in Lahore. Sahib Kaur gave birth to a stillborn son who was named Jawahar Singh and passed away. This ended any justification for a renewed claim to the regency of Chand Kaur and she too was killed.

Sohan Lal Suri notes with great horror about how Sher Singh secretly ordered for ‘hot medicines’ to be administered to Nau Nihal Singh’s widows, to ensure that they miscarried any pregnancies to ensure the throne from himself. Nanaki Kaur was also expecting hence was also given medicines to abort her pregnancy, like Sahib Kaur.

The First Anglo-Sikh War began in late 1845, after a combination of increasing disorder in the Sikh empire following the death of Ranjit Singh in 1839 and the assassinations' of Maharaja Kharak Singh, Maharaja Nau Nihal Singh and Maharaja Sher Singh along with provocations by the British East India Company led to the Sikh Khalsa Army invading British territory. The British had won the first two major battles of the war through a combination of luck, the steadfastness of British and Bengal units and deliberate treachery by Tej Singh and Lal Singh, the commanders of the Sikh Army. Her father lead the Sikh Khalsa during the Battle of Sobraon and martyred.

Her jagirs along with those of Bibi Khem Kaur Dhillon, second wife of Kharak Singh were reduced due to their roles in the war being perceived anti-British. Nanaki Kaur was given a pension of Rs. 4,600. Nanaki Kaur oversaw the building of the samadhis of her mother-in-law, Maharani Chand Kaur and Rani Sahib Kaur in The Royal Lahore Garden alongside the samadhi of Maharani Datar Kaur, her grandmother-in-law who was lovingly called Mai Nakkain by Maharaja Ranjit Singh.
