= Pratap Singh (Sikh prince) =

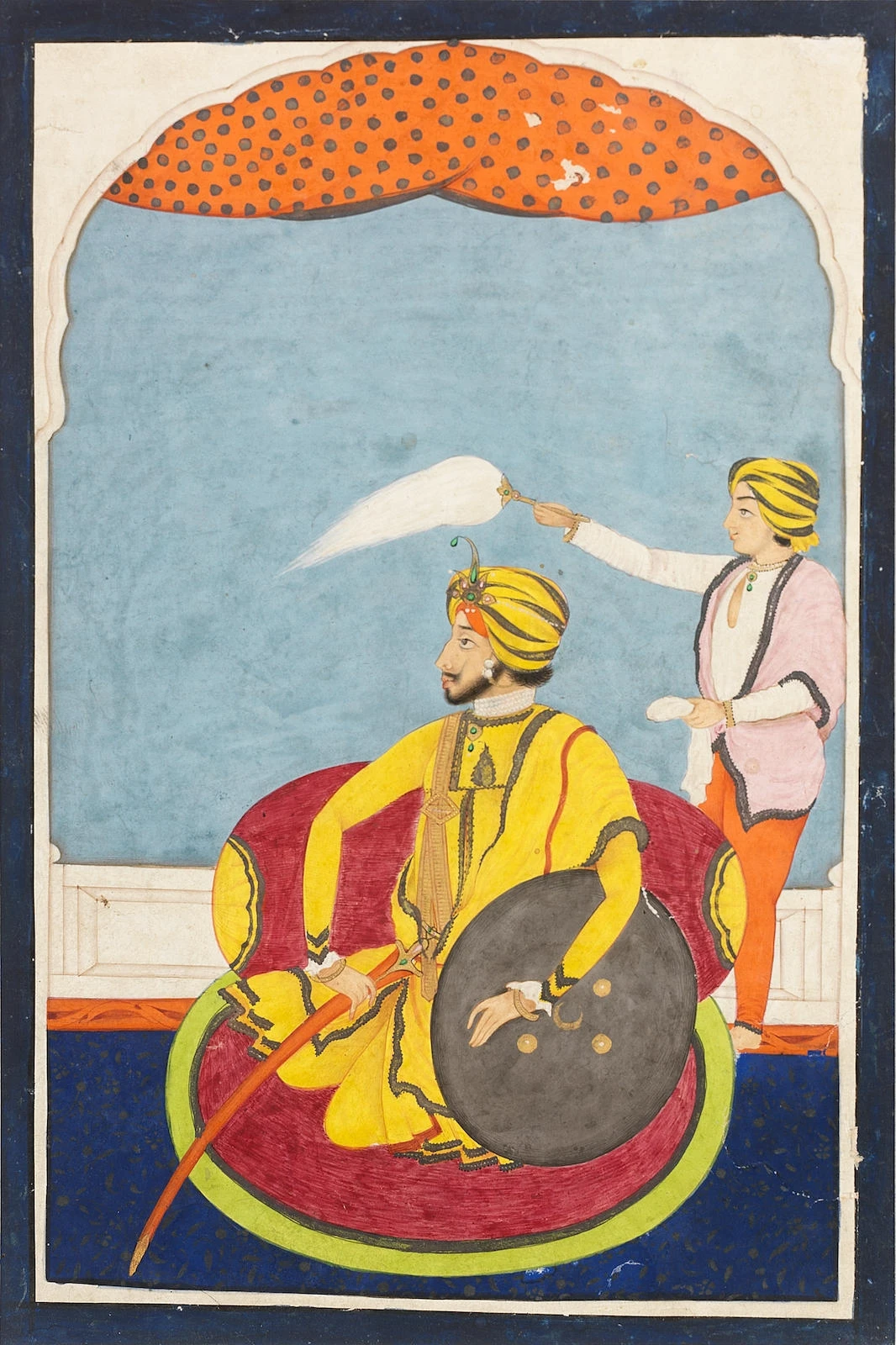
Pratap Singh, son of Sher Singh, seated on a terrace, with an attendant holding a flywhisk

Tikka Sahib Pratap Singh Bahadur (1831 – 15 September 1843) was the eldest son of Sher Singh, Maharaja of Sikh Empire. His mother was Maharani Prem Kaur.

== Biography ==
Pratap Singh was installed as heir apparent with the title of Tikka Sahib by his father at Lahore Fort on 27 January 1841. The prince and his father were both killed by Ajit Singh Sandhanwalia and Wazir Dhian Singh Dogra on 15 September 1843 at Shah Bilowal Baradari in Lahore. Sher Singh, his father, was killed by the Sandhawalias immediately before him. Both Pratap Singh and Sher Singh were cremated together at Shah Bilowal Baradari. Their samadhis were erected there, which still exist (31°35'39.5"N 74°21'19.1"E).

== Gallery ==
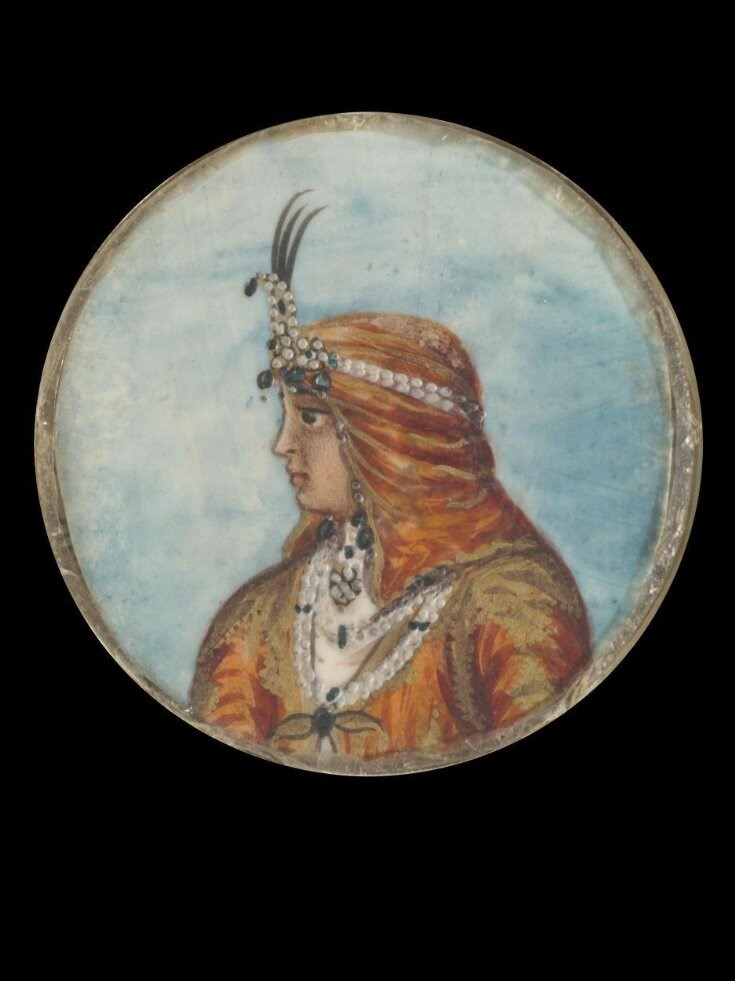
Painting on ivory of Pratap Singh of Lahore

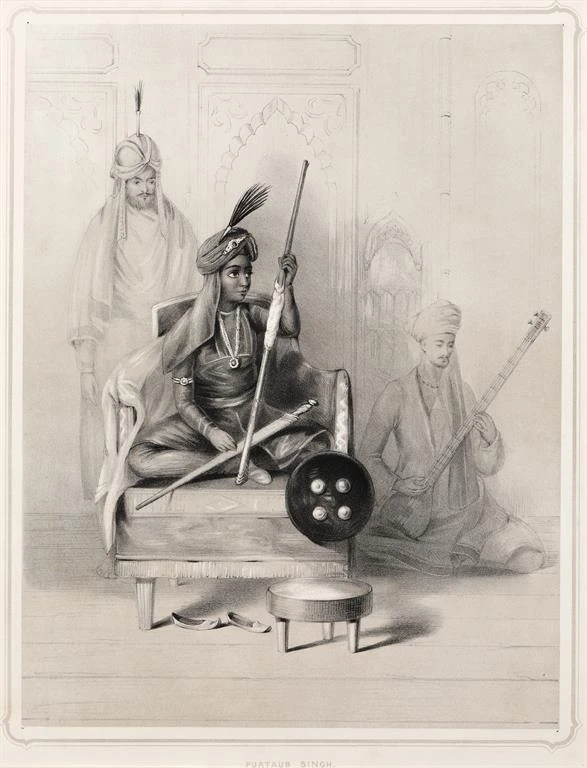
Pratap Singh, prince of the Sikh Empire
