= Sahib Kaur =

- Maharani of the Sikh Empire
- Born: Lahore, Sikh Empire
- Died: c. 1841
- Burial: Royal Garden, Lahore (Samadhi) (present day Islamia College Civil Lines)
- Spouse: Nau Nihal Singh
- Issue: Jawahar Singh
- House: Sukerchakia (by marriage)
- Father: Sardar Gurdit Singh Gilwaliwala
- Religion: Sikhism

Sahib Kaur (died 1841) was the second wife of Nau Nihal Singh, the third Maharaja of the Sikh Empire, and the mother of his son, Jawahar Singh.

== Biography ==
Kaur was born to Sardar Gurdit Singh Gilwaliwala of Amritsar. She became the second wife of Nau Nihal Singh who was second in line of succession to the throne of Punjab after his father, Kharak Singh. He was the only son of Maharaja Kharak Singh and his queen consort, Maharani Chand Kaur and grandson of the legendary Maharaja Ranjit Singh and his queen consort, Maharani Datar Kaur of the Nakai Misl.

After the accession of Kharak Singh as the Maharaja, Kunwar Nau Nihal Singh became the Yuvraj (crown prince).

The effect of Chet Singh Bajwa, who was a relative of Inder Kaur Bajwa, the fourth wife of Maharaja Kharak Singh, on the newly crowned king started to affect his relationship with the Lahore Darbar as well as his own son. It was decided to kill Chet Singh Bajwa and divest the Maharaja of all powers and to entrust Nau Nihal Singh with the responsibility of running the administration. From October 8, 1839, Kharak Singh was deprived of all his administrative powers, and all authority passed to Nau Nihal Singh. Thus beginning his reign. Kharak Singh died on November 5, 1940, and Nau Nihal Singh met a fatal accident on the very day of his father's cremation and died. The Hazuri Bagh Gateway collapse, which allegedly caused Nau Nihal's death, still remains a mystery. Many think it was engineered by the Dogras or the British or the partisans of Chet Singh Bajwa. Dr Honigberger states that Nau Nihal Singh was alive when he was taken inside the fort by Dhian Singh Dogra. According to Alexander Gardner, who was just steps behind Nau Nihal when the incident took place, the prince had sustained only minor injuries during this episode: he was well enough to walk on his own, and agreed to be taken on a stretcher only because of Gardner's insistence. However, when the court physician Johann Martin Honigberger came to attend to Nau Nihal in a tent, he observed that the prince's skull had been crushed, and the bedsheet was covered with blood and brain tissue. Dhian Singh insisted that the prince had suffered these injuries during the alleged accident in Hazuri Bagh. Nau Nihal died hours later, although the courtiers did not make this news public until three days later in an attempt to avoid panic. According to Gardner, five artillery men had carried Nau Nihal from Hazuri Bagh to the tent: two of these men died under mysterious circumstances, two went on leave and never re-joined service, and one disappeared without explanation. Garder puts the blame on Dhian Singh and Honigberger too suggests that along with people who were loyal to Chet Singh Bajwa. Official court historian, Sohan Lal Suri labels it as a conspiracy of Sher Singh and Dhian Singh to claim the throne of the Punjab.

After the deaths of Kharak Singh and Nau Nihal Singh, Maharani Chand Kaur took the reins of power and claimed that since Sahib Kaur was pregnant her child would become the next ruler. On 2 December 1840 Chand Kaur was proclaimed Maharani of the Punjab, with the title Malika Muqaddasa (Queen Immaculate) and became the only female ruler the Sikh Empire. Sher Singh whose claim to the throne was supported by Dhian Singh Dogra left the capital after she gained complete control of the administration together with her supporters. But Sher Singh still had the support of the army and in 1841 he arrived in Lahore and secured a ceasefire. She was persuaded to accept a jagir and relinquish her claim to the throne and retired to her late son's palace in Lahore. Sahib Kaur gave birth to a stillborn son who was named Shahzada Jawahar Singh and passed away. This ended any justification for a renewed claim to the regency of Chand Kaur and she too was killed in 1842.

Sohan Lal Suri notes with great horror how Sher Singh secretly ordered for ‘hot medicines’ to be administered to Nau Nihal Singh’s widows, to ensure that they miscarried any pregnancies to ensure the throne from himself. Dr Honigberger claims that as a doctor he was always suspicious of the manner of the miscarriage of the baby boy of Sahib Kaur. Maharani Nanaki Kaur too was pregnant hence was also given medicines which resulted in a miscarriage.

== Legacy ==
Her Samadhi is located is the Royal Garden in between her mother-in-law, Chand Kaur's samadhi and her grandmother-in-law, Datar Kaur's samadhi lovingly called Mai Nakain by Maharaja Ranjit Singh. The samadhi complex is nearby the Tomb of Anarkali and is now within the campus of Government Islamia College, Civil Lines.
