= Dhyan Singh =

Dhyan Singh is the name of:

- Dhian Singh, Dogra prime minister of Maharaja Ranjit Singh of Lahore
- Dhyan Chand (1905–1979), Indian field hockey player
