= Fatehgarh Churian =

- Town
- Nickname: F.G.C
- Interactive map of Fatehgarh Churian
- Coordinates: 31.8644°N 74.9511°E
- Country: India
- State: Punjab
- District: Gurdaspur

Population (2011)
  - Total: 13,070

Languages
  - Official: Punjabi
- Time zone: UTC+5:30 (IST)
- Vehicle registration: PB-18

Fatehgarh Churian is a town located in Gurdaspur district in Punjab, India. It is nearby Gurdaspur city, the district headquarter. It is a municipal council of the Gurdaspur district. The city lies 15 kilometres from the Pakistani border. It is located 485 kilometres north of New Delhi, India.

== Geography ==
Fatehgarh Churian is located at the geographic coordinates of 31° 51' 51.516 N and 74° 57' 23.94 E. It is located at an altitude of 237 meter above sea level. It is 256 km from the current state capital in Chandigarh. It is situated in the time zone UTC +5:30.

== Demographics ==
According to 2010 estimates, it had a population of 21,223 inhabitants. Fatehgarh Churian is a Municipal Council city in district of Gurdaspur, Punjab. The Fatehgarh Churian city is divided into 13 wards for which elections are held every 5 years. The Fatehgarh Churian Municipal Council has population of 13,070 of which 6,881 are males while 6,189 are females as per report released by Census India 2011.

The population of children aged 0–6 is 1351 which is 10.34% of total population of Fatehgarh Churian (M Cl). In Fatehgarh Churian Municipal Council, the female sex ratio is 899 against state average of 895. Moreover the child sex ratio in Fatehgarh Churian is around 826 compared to Punjab state average of 846. The literacy rate of Fatehgarh Churian city is 85.46% higher than the state average of 75.84%. In Fatehgarh Churian, male literacy is around 89.09% while the female literacy rate is 81.46%.

Out of total population of 13,170, 42.10% are Hindu, 41.12% are Sikh, 16.06% are Christian, 0.58% Muslims, 0.03% Jain, 0.02% Buddhist 0.05% others and 0.06% who did not state their religion as of 2011.

According to the 2011 census, the language with the largest number of speakers in Fatehgarh Chrurian was Punjabi with 12,939 speakers, followed by Hindi with 121 and 10 people with other languages.

The table below shows the population of different religious groups in Fatehgarh Churian city and their gender ratio, as of 2011 census.

Population by religious groups in Fatehgarh Churian city, 2011 census
Religion	Total	Female	Male	Gender ratio
Hindu	5,502	2,575	2,927	879
Sikh	5,372	2,530	2,842	890
Christian	2,099	1,032	1,067	967
Muslim	76	42	34	1235
Jain	4	4	0	--
Buddhist	3	0	3	--
Other religions	6	0	6	--
Not stated	8	6	2	3000
Total	13,070	6,189	6,881	899

== History ==
Prior to the 14th century, Fatehgarh Churian was an area dominated by the Bandesha Jatts. They are believed to have arrived in this region after they were uprooted by raids of Mohammad Ghazni and subsequent "forced Islamisation" in southern Punjab and Sindh regions. Bandesha were initially referred to as Ba-Desha(people from different Desh). Later the Jatts here converted to Islam under Sufi influence. Baba shri chand ji son sh Guru Nanak dev ji also visited this town. The town was earlier a village named Churianvala because it is believed that bangle traders used to sell their goods here.

During the 18th century, nearby 1745 the Kanhaiya Misl of Sandhu Jatts after destroying Muslim controlled areas, moved towards Amritsar, one section under leadership of Baghel Singh Sandhu and his son Haqiqat Singh Sandhu settled in Sohian village. After some time, they established a village Sangatpura to settle their armies. During this conquest, the local Hindus of Churianvala told the Kanhaiya Sardars about the misdeeds of Churianvala's Muslims towards them. Under the Flag of Khalsa, the Kanhaiya Sardars destroyed the Chrianvala settlement and made the wrongdoers pay for their sins. After the defeat, Muslim Bandeshas accepted Sikhism . After his win, he named the area as Fatehgarh, but because the area was called Churianvala, the area slowly became known as Fatehgarh Churian. Fatehgarh Churian became the headquarters of Haqiqat Singh. Haqiqat Singh Kanhaiya Sandhu further united Kotli Soorat Malhi, Kalanur, Taragarh, Narot Jaimal Singh and many villages under his territory. Fatehgarh Churian became the capital of his kingdom, and became very prosperous under his policies. To form an alliance with the Phulkian Misl, Haqiqat Singh married his son Jaimal Singh Kanhaiya to Sahib Kaur, daughter of Raja Amar Singh of Patiala. In 1782, Haqiqat Singh Kanhaiya died, and control was passed down to his son Jaimal Singh Kanhaiya.

Kharak Singh, son of Maharaja Ranjit Singh, was married to Chand Kaur, daughter of Sardar Jaimal Singh Kanhaiya in this town. Sardar Jaimal Singh Kanhaiya built a temple called Panj Mandir with a Pucca tank for the Anand Karaj, which still stands. The marriage was celebrated throughout Punjab, and Fatehgarh Churian became the center of attraction. For the convenience of Maharaja Ranjit Singh's guests, Jaimal Singh Kanhaiya built a huge pond and 12 darhi. Later on, his son Chanda Singh Kanhaiya, on the request of his Purohit, built a temple near this pond and 12 darhi, which is today known as Talab Wala Mandir.

Gagranwala Mandir is the most popular temple in Fatehgarh Churian. It was constructed by Chanda Singh Kanhaiya, on his land, for the local Hindu population. The temple is famous for its Golden Gagrans, donated by Chanda Singh Kanhaiya. After the Second Anglo-Sikh War, most of the estates of Chanda Singh Kanhaiya were captured by the British, because Chanda Singh Kanhaiya hadn't sided with the British. After Fatehgarh Churian was included in the British territory, Diwans of Kanhaiya Misl pledged allegiance to the British Crown. This broke the relationship between Diwans and Kanhaiyas, and most of the estates of Chanda Singh Kanhaiya were granted to Diwans by the British. Diwan Dilbag Rai, among the Diwans, was made honorary magistrate of Fatehgarh Churian by the British in the early 20th century, and represented the local populace. Diwans were the richest family of the town, as they owned more than 600 acres of land which was gone under possession to British gov from Kanhaiyas. Dinesh Khanna men's single Badminton Asian champion of 1965 belonged to Diwan Family.

Before 1947, the town had a majority Muslim population around 60% that included Shias and Sunnis in equal numbers.

In July 2021, it was found that Fatehgarh Churian was the only urban local body (ULB) in Punjab that was not open defecation free (ODF).

== Politics ==
The city is part of the Fatehgarh Churian Assembly Constituency.

== Events ==
Fatehgarh hosts a lot of religious events and people from nearby villages visit the city to be a part of the celebrations. Many local clubs and religious societies help in the celebrations. Organizing Sant Samelans, gatherings of seers and saints, and Shoba Yatras are now traditions of the town. Nearby historic landmarks include Dhianpur Dhaam, Ramdass, and Chola Sahib. The River Ravi is also close by.

== Education ==
The list of major educational institutions in Fatehgarh Churian is given below.

- Pandit Mohan Lal SD College for Girls
- St. Francis Convent School, Fatehgarh Churian
- Captain's School Of Excellence, Fatehgarh Churian
- Disciplined Disciples International School (DDIS)
- Saraswati Vidya Mandir, Fatehgarh Churian
- Guru Nanak High School
- Shri Ram Senior Secondary School
- New Modern School
- Lala Dhirat Ram MVM

== Health ==
The list of some of the major hospitals and medical institutions in Fatehgarh Churian is given below.

- City Hospital
- Fatehgarh Civil Hospital
- Mishra Hospital
- Randhawa eye care hospital
- Randhawa Dental care centre
- Bibi kaulan Ji Hospital
- Arsh Super Speciality clinic
- Sandhu Clinic

== Historical places ==
Gagranwala Mandir, Panj Mandir, Talab(built by Kanhaiya Misl), Samadhs of Kanhaiya Misl Sardars are the places one must checkout in their lifetime when visiting Fatehgarh Churian.

== Notable people ==
- Sunanda Sharma, a singer and actress
