= Ajit Singh Sandhawalia =

Sikh chieftain

Sardar Ajit Singh Sandhawalia
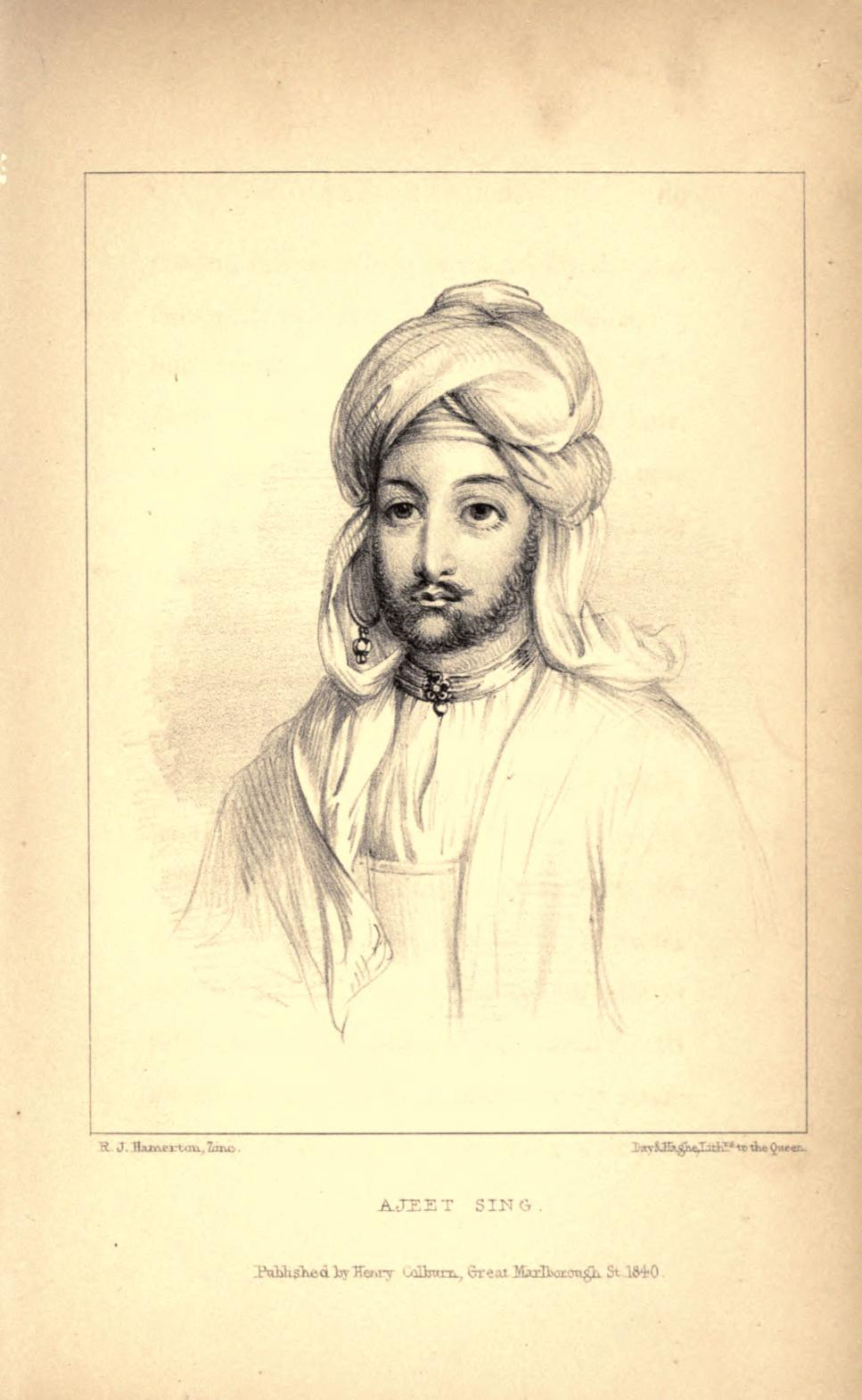
- Sardar Ajit Singh Sandhawalia of Raja Sansi, ca.1840
- Known for: Assassin of Maharaja Sher Singh
- Parent: Basava Singh Sandhawalia (father)
- Family: SandhawaliaJat clan

Ajit Singh Sandhawalia was a Sikh chieftain from the Sandhawalia Jat clan who assassinated Sher Singh, the ruler of the Sikh Empire, on 15 September 1843.

== Biography ==
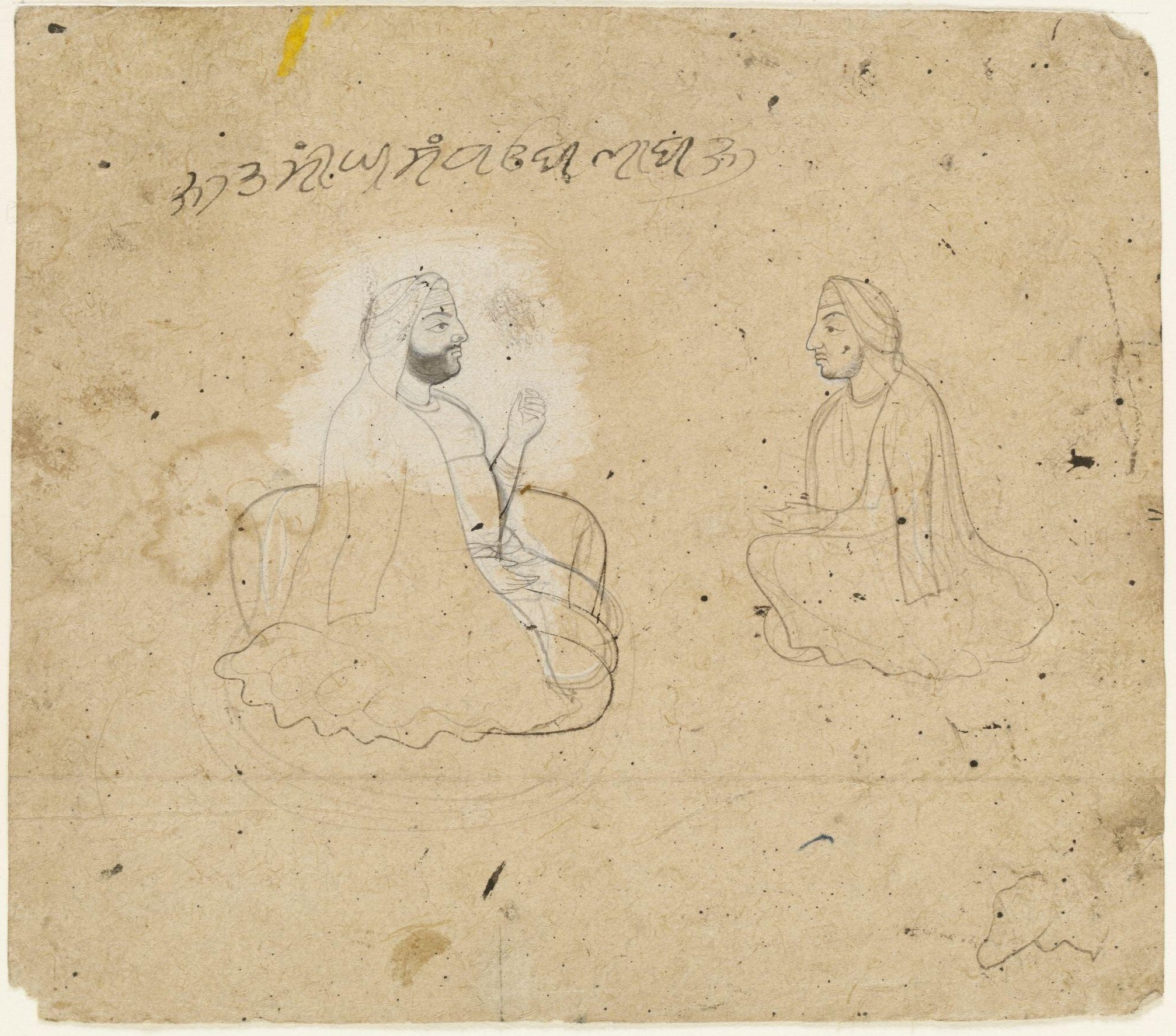
Depiction of Ajit Singh Sandhawalia

Ajit Singh was the son of Basava Singh Sandhawalia, a sardar from Rajasansi.

After the assassination of Nau Nihal Singh, the Sandhawalia clan supported Chand Kaur to become the ruler. But when Sher Singh forced Chand Kaur to abdicate the throne, the Sandhawalias felt cheated and refused to accept his rule. The Sandhawalias were banished from the Khalsa empire and fled to Calcutta in British India.

British civil servant George Russell Clerk convinced Sher Singh to let the Sandhawalias enter the empire again. Sher Singh welcomed Ajit Singh back with open arms.

=== Sher Singh's assassination ===
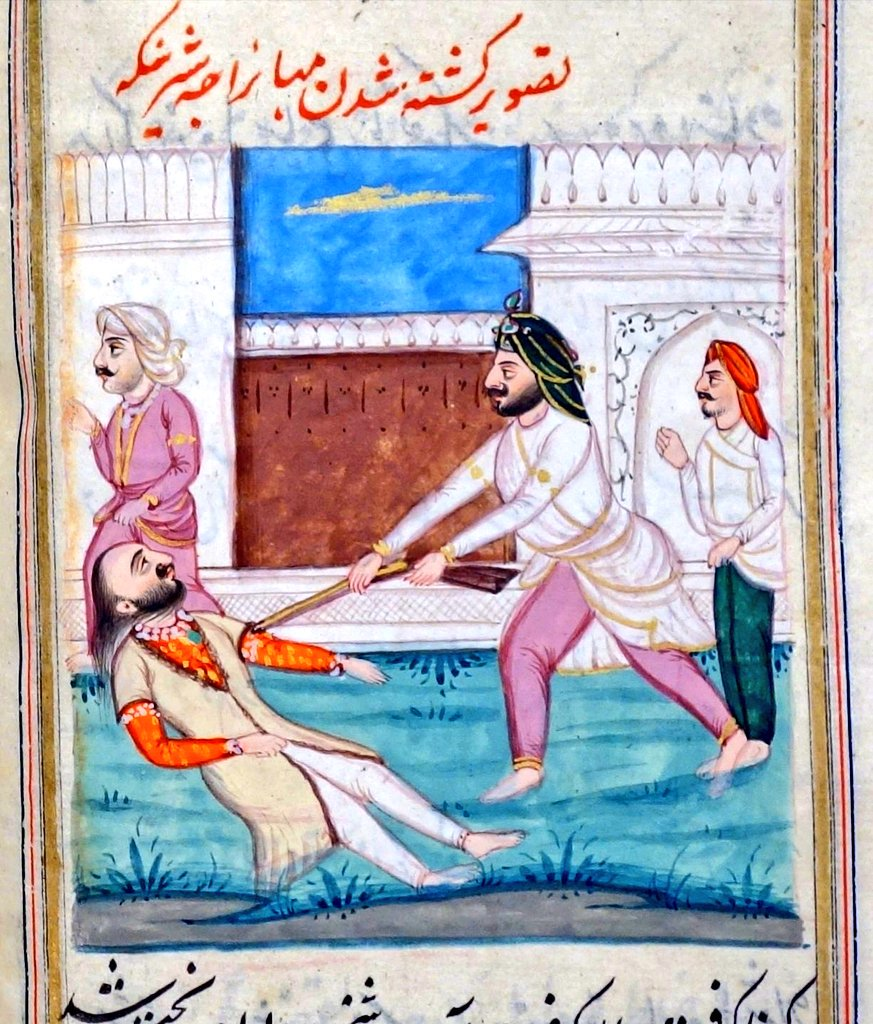
Depiction of the assassination of Maharaja Sher Singh by the Sandhawalia Sardars

Ajit Singh killed Sher Singh after asking him to inspect a new shotgun. Ajit Singh then pulled the trigger and then killed the wounded Sher Singh with his sword by cutting off his head.

After assassinating Sher Singh, Ajit Singh and his uncle, Lahina Singh, escaped and went on to assassinate Dhian Singh, the wazir of Sikh empire.
