= The Secret of Dr. Honigberger =

1940 novella by Mircea Eliade

- First edition
- Author: Mircea Eliade
- Original title: Secretul doctorului Honigberger
- Translator: William Ames Coates
- Language: Romanian
- Publisher: Socec
- Publication date: 1940
- Publication place: Romania
- English publication date: 1970

The Secret of Dr. Honigberger (Romanian: Secretul doctorului Honigberger) is a 1940 novella by the Romanian writer Mircea Eliade. It centres on research for a biography of 19th-century physician named Johann Martin Honigberger, who had served as a physician in India while allegedly searching for the invisible kingdom of Shambhala, as well as his early 20th-century biographer who mysteriously vanished.

Honigberger was a real person, a physician and ethnographer who travelled in Asia in the 19th century. The novella was first published in Romania in 1940 together with Eliade's novella Nights at Serampore, which also revolves around India and has similar supernatural elements. The two novellas were translated into English by William Ames Coates and published in 1970 as Two Tales of the Occult, and in 1986 as Two Strange Tales. A translation by Ana Cartianu was published in 1992 under the title Doctor Honigberger's Secret, as part of the Eliade omnibus volume Mystic Stories.

== See also ==
- 1940 in literature
- Romanian literature
