= Shahdeo Singh =

Sikh prince (1844–?)

- Shahzada Bahadur
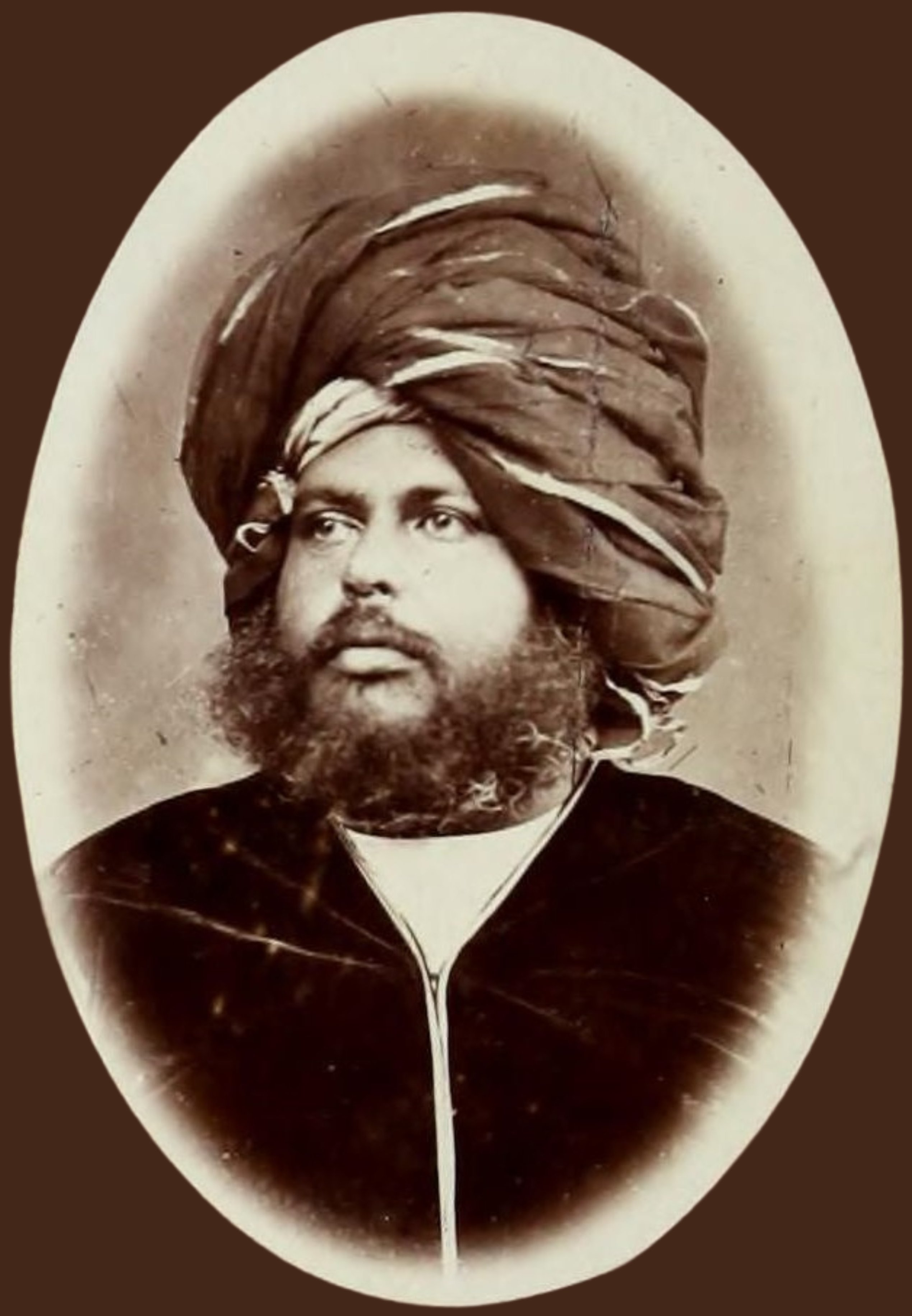
- Born: 1844; Lahore
- Died: Unknown
- Issue: Basdev Singh; Sukhdev Singh; Harbans Kaur
- House: Sukerchakia
- Father: Sher Singh
- Mother: Dakno Kaur Chang
- Religion: Sikhism

Shahzada Bahadur Shahdeo Singh (born 1844) (Urdu: شیر سنگھ; Hindi: शेर सिंह), also spelt as Shiv Deo Singh or Shivdev Singh, was the son of Sher Singh, Maharaja of the Sikh Empire, and his wife, Dakno Kaur(Chang Rani). He was awarded a jagir outside of Punjab worth Rs. 10,000 after 1849. Along with Duleep Singh, Shahdeo Singh was one of the few surviving legitimate claimants to the Sikh throne as a direct descendant of Ranjit Singh after the annexation of Punjab by the British in 1849.

== Life in exile ==
=== Fatehgarh ===
When his uncle, Duleep Singh, was deposed by the East India Company on 29 March 1849 and sent to reside at Fategarh on 21 December 1849, Shahdeo, along with her mother, accompanied him at the age of five, they went on a pilgrimage (as stated by their companion, Satnamo Kaur), to Benares. He was then placed in the care of Sardar Bahadur Bur Singh of Mukerian.

=== London ===
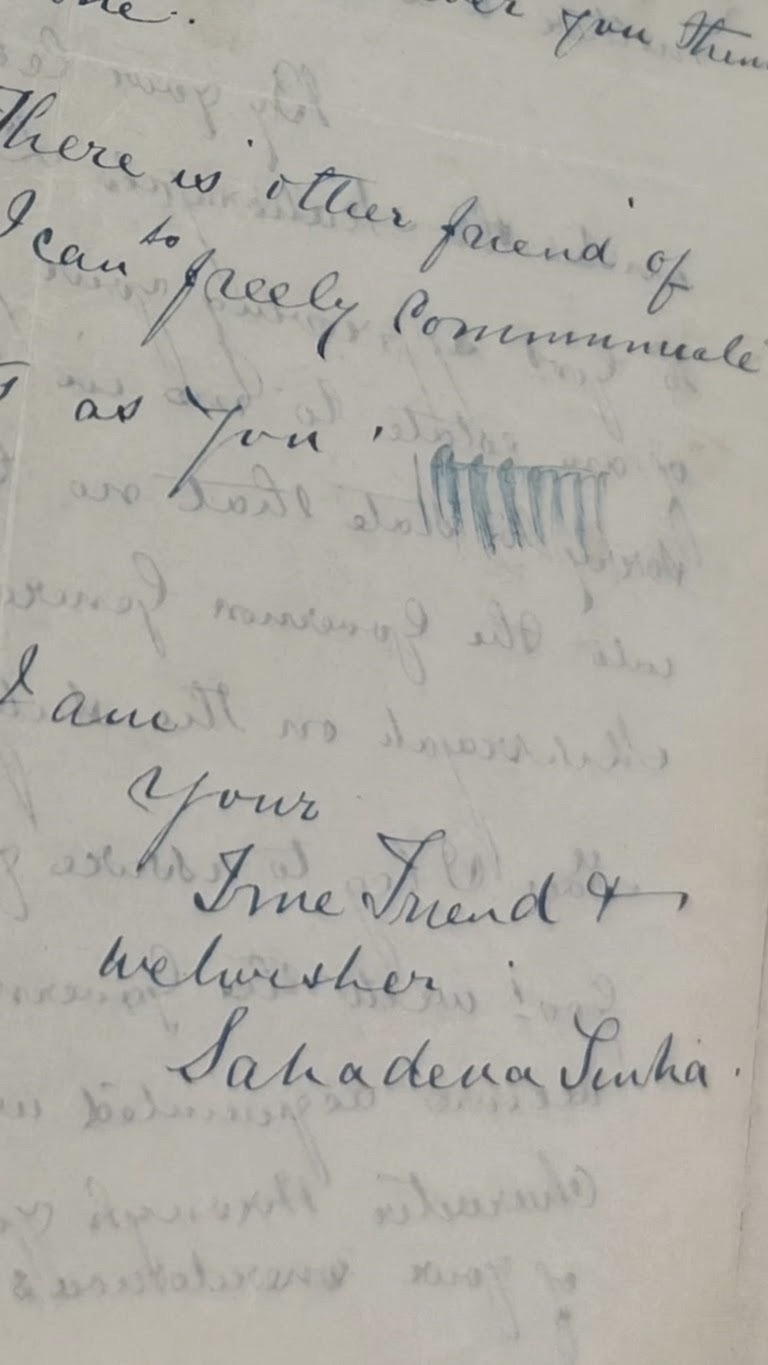
Letter written by Shahdeo Singh for Duleep Singh, 1859

In 1854, when his uncle Duleep Singh was sent to England, Shahdeo again accompanied him. After Duleep expressed a desire to become an English country-gentleman and move to England, Dalhousie was initially skeptical of the idea but decided to send Shahdeo Singh to accompany Duleep Singh to England. This was because Shahdeo Singh was also a potential claimant to the former Sikh throne, with Shahdeo's mother being vocal about it, and Dalhousie thought it would benefit the British mission to send him off to England alongside his now Christian relative Duleep. Lord Dalhousie stated the following on the matter:

Shiv Dev Singh is an intelligent little boy with a foolish mother, who is too much inclined to puff up the child with notions that he is the only hopeful Maharajah now, since Dalip has become a Christian. Hence we thought it best for him to go with his uncle.

— Lord Dalhousie

== Awadh ==
He settled in Raebareli, Awadh in October 1861, where the British Government granted him a hereditary jagir and pension. He had Asolear de-Tierra Press in Raebareli.

He held the Taluqdari estates of Pandri Ganeshpur, Behta, and Gokalpur, which comprised 18 villages and 3 pattis in Raebareli. Pandri Ganeshpur originally formed part of the confiscated estate of Rana Beni Madho, the chieftain of Shankarpur.

== Marriage ==
In 1860, he married the daughter of Sardar Fateh Singh, a jagirdar of Suga in Thanesar.
