= Sher Singh's famine =

1831 famine in Kashmir

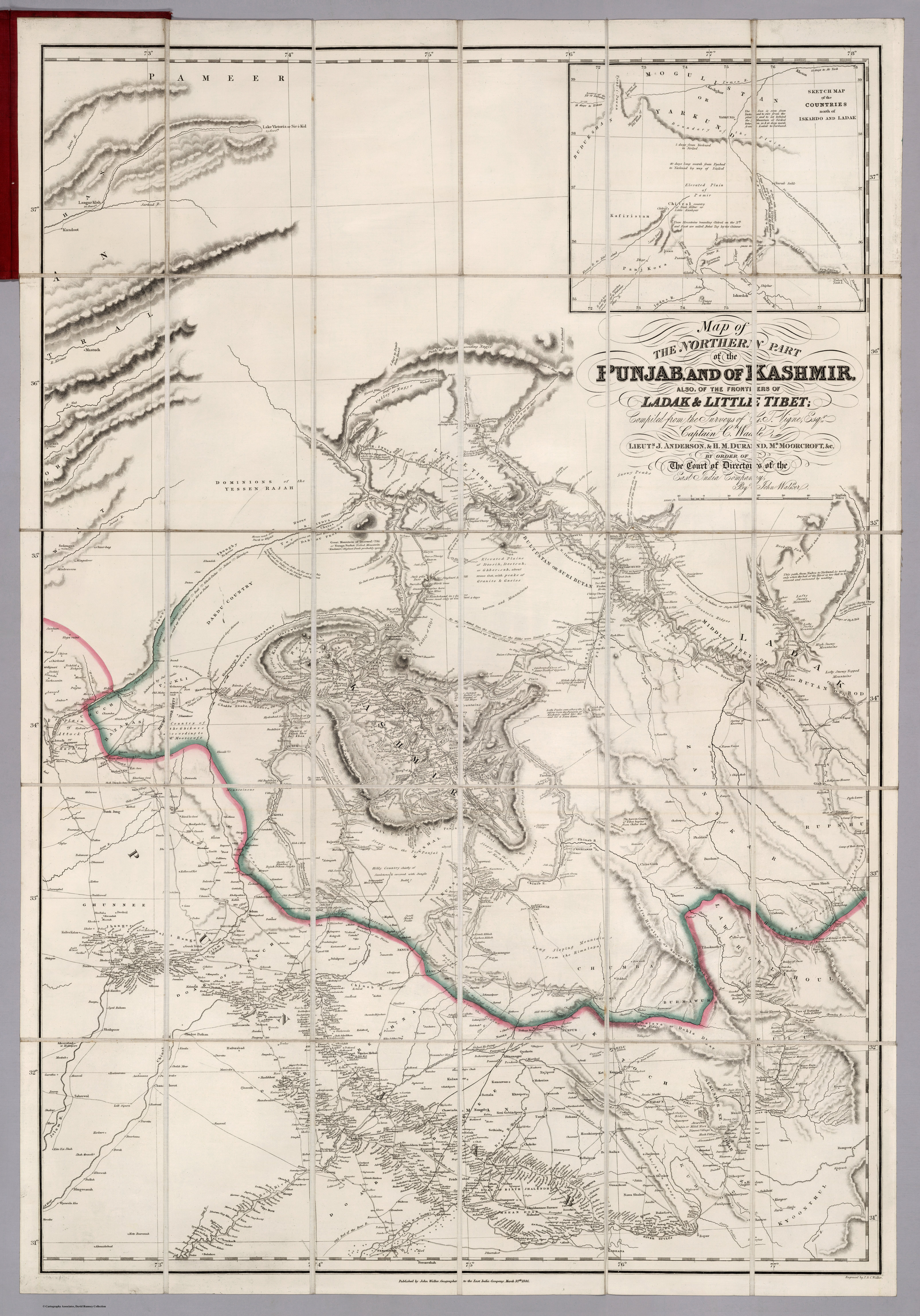
- Map of the Northern Part of the Punjab and of Kashmir, 1846
- Country: Sikh Empire
- Location: Kashmir Valley, especially Srinagar
- Period: 1831
- Total deaths: est. 600.000
- Refugees: Large-scale migration from Kashmir toward Punjab, especially Amritsar.
- Causes: Early autumn snowfall that destroyed the standing paddy crop; Intensified by grain seizures, hoarding, and heavy revenue exactions.
- Theory: Environmental shock compounded by structural food insecurity and administrative failure.
- Relief: Grain imports from Punjab and neighboring regions, controlled grain sales at reduced prices, anti-hoarding measures, remission of some dues, and reconstruction under Mihan Singh.
- Net food imports: 20,000 maunds of corn sent from Punjab, with additional grain purchased from Muzaffarabad, Rajouri, and Kishtwar.
- Effect on demographics: Severe depopulation, mass mortality, and outward migration.
- Consequences: Depopulation, migration, damage to irrigation works and cultivated land after subsequent flooding, and administrative changes in Kashmir.

Sher Singh's famine was a famine in Kashmir during the rule of the Sikh Empire, generally dated to 1831 and named after Prince Sher Singh, the provincial governor. It followed an unusually early autumn snowfall that ruined the standing paddy crop, but later historians have also linked its severity to chronic food insecurity, the withholding or seizure of grain, hoarding, and heavy revenue exactions. A commonly repeated estimate states that the population of Kashmir fell from about 800,000 to 200,000. The famine was followed by flooding that damaged irrigation works and submerged cultivated land, and it has been treated in the historiography of Kashmir as one of the major nineteenth-century food crises in the valley.

== Background ==
In nineteenth-century Kashmir, recurring food shortages were common even in years without a full-scale famine. This reflected a persistent cycle of subsistence crises, where much of the peasantry had enough food to last only part of the year. The situation was tied to poverty, heavy state demands, and the slim margin between survival and surplus in an agrarian economy reliant on the autumn harvest. In that wider context, the Sher Singh famine was not simply an isolated natural disaster, but an acute crisis emerging within a society already marked by structural scarcity. A modern overview citing earlier historians states that Kashmir had experienced repeated major famines and that the principal environmental triggers were untimely snow or heavy rainfall at the moment of harvest.

== Causes ==
The immediate cause most commonly given is an early autumn snowfall in 1831 that destroyed the standing rice crop. According to Muhammad Yusuf Saraf, stating that when only a small portion of the crop had been cut, about eight inches of snow fell in a single night, followed by mist and frost severe enough to freeze lakes, rivers, and streams. These conditions damaged both grain and fodder supplies and transformed a bad harvest into a wider subsistence crisis.

The famine's severity is not explained by weather alone. Saraf states that, before the harvest failure, Jamadar Khushhal Singh and Shaikh Ghulam Muhy-ud-Din halted the sale of grain in government stores and attempted to increase reserves for the expected arrival of Maharaja Ranjit Singh and his large retinue, leaving little grain with the population. A later summary based on earlier Kashmiri historians similarly states that the intensity of the famine was increased when agents of Ranjit Singh confiscated stored agricultural produce from the inhabitants.

Additionally, revenue collectors and shawl merchants embezzled public funds and hoarded grain, further worsening shortages during a period of growing distress. Heavy revenue demands and sustained fiscal extraction also placed immense pressure on the wider population, leaving cultivators and laborers with little reserve in years of weak harvests. Under such conditions, chronic scarcity, exploitative administration, and the unequal distribution of resources greatly intensified the effects of crop failure and helped turn subsistence crisis into famine.

== Course of the famine ==
The initial restriction of grain sales provoked a valley-wide outcry, but the crisis was not effectively addressed before snowfall destroyed the harvest. Domestic animals perished for want of fodder, while many inhabitants, left without sufficient food or warm clothing, died in large numbers.

The crisis was further aggravated by the conduct of Jamadar Khushhal Singh, who had been sent from Lahore with Bhai Gurmukh Singh and Shaikh Ghulam Muhy-ud-Din to restore order and relieve scarcity, but instead initially focused on recovering revenue arrears and enforcing coercive exactions. Suspected officials and merchants were imprisoned and pressured for payments before any substantial food relief was organized, contributing to mass protest and intensifying public fear.

According to Sohan Lal Suri and other contemporary testimony, large numbers of Kashmiris became refugees and abandoned their homes, with many moving toward Punjab. Survivors gathered in places such as Amritsar and from there dispersed more widely to Delhi, Calcutta, and Banaras. Migration was one of the characteristic responses to famine in Kashmir, and the famine of 1831 was accompanied by hunger-marches into Punjab.

== Relief efforts ==
Maharaja Ranjit Singh eventually concluded that Khushhal Singh had raised money only at the cost of ruining Kashmir. Khushhal Singh was accordingly demoted and his property confiscated, while the Lahore Darbar ordered the removal of restrictions and duties on the movement of cereals into Kashmir and instructed neighboring chiefs and grain merchants to send supplies into the valley. Leading revenue officials and shawl merchants suspected of hoarding grain and contributing to scarcity were also imprisoned.

The subsequent administration of Colonel Mihan Singh introduced the principal relief and recovery measures in the aftermath of the famine. He entered a devastated valley and arranged for the import of grain from the Punjab, Muzaffarabad, Rajouri, and Kishtwar, which was then sold in Kashmir at prices below cost. Livestock and other food supplies were also brought in, while tours of the countryside were undertaken to encourage peasants to resume cultivation. Hoarders were compelled to sell grain publicly, some outstanding dues were remitted, and new controls were imposed over weights, measures, and market practices.

These measures appear to have been comparatively effective. Many peasants who had abandoned cultivation returned to their lands, and within two years the price of shali had fallen substantially. Bridges, canals, and bunds that had been neglected or damaged were also repaired under Mihan Singh's administration.

== Death toll and demographic impact ==
The famine reduced the population of Kashmir from 800,000 to 200,000. A later summary repeating the estimate of Walter Roper Lawrence, an Indian Civil Service officer and author of The Valley of Kashmir (1895), gives the same figure. Thousands died for want of food and warm clothing, and large numbers also perished on the roads during migration. The famine thus caused mass mortality and severe depopulation in Kashmir. Later accounts describe extensive death from starvation and significant migration from Kashmir into Punjab and British India. D. C. Sharma states that Srinagar lost two-thirds of its population through death and desertion during the crisis.

== Economic and social consequences ==
The famine disrupted both agrarian and urban life. Factories, workshops, and business activity came to a standstill as food prices rose sharply. Peasants and shawl-weavers were among the principal sufferers from the exactions used to raise cash and valuables during the crisis, while the poorest rural and artisanal groups were especially exposed to famine conditions and forced migration. Several accounts describe extreme family strategies of survival, including the sale of property and, in some cases, the sale of children in exchange for food or survival elsewhere. These conditions reflected the depth of the breakdown in subsistence and market exchange during the famine years. The famine was also followed by a flood that damaged irrigation works and submerged cultivated areas, thereby prolonging the economic effects of the crisis beyond the initial harvest failure. The famine was accompanied by the trafficking and sale of Kashmiri girls in Punjab, where slave girls and child prostitutes were reportedly widely available during the crisis. Reported prices ranged from Rs. 15 to Rs. 200, with one account stating that a common rate was Rs. 50 to Rs. 60 per foot of height.

== Political consequences ==
The famine contributed to a reordering of administration in Kashmir under Sikh rule. Saraf states that Sher Singh was recalled and replaced by Mihan Singh. Additionally, the Lahore Darbar saw the incident as a serious administrative failure, leading to Khushhal Singh’s punishment, stricter oversight in appointing officials to Kashmir, and new central government directives to restore peace, ensure supplies, and rebuild public trust.

== Bibliography ==
- Parmu, R. K. (1977). A History of Sikh Rule in Kashmir, 1819–1846. Department of Education, Jammu and Kashmir Government.
- Saraf, Muhammad Yusuf (1977). Kashmiris Fight for Freedom, 1819–1946. Vol. 1. Ferozsons.
- Sufi, G. M. D. (1948). Kashir, Being a History of Kashmir. Vol. 2.
- Islam, K. M. Baharul; Nomani, Zafar Mahfooz, eds. (2021). Environment Impact Assessment: Precept & Practice. CRC Press. ISBN 9781000425901.
- Mehran, Danish (2015). "Food Shortages in Kashmir: Response of Society" (PDF). The Journal of Central Asian Studies. 22: 137–152.
- Gupta, Hari Ram (1991). History of the Sikhs: The Sikh Lion of Lahore, Maharaja Ranjit Singh, 1799–1839 (3rd ed.). Munshiram Manoharlal. ISBN 9788121505154.
- Sharma, D. C. (1984). Kashmir Under Maharaja Ranjit Singh. Atlantic Publishers & Distributors. ISBN 9788171560943.
