= Sher Singh =

Maharaja of the Sikh Empire from 1841 to 1843

- Maharaja of Punjab; Maharaja of Lahore; Sarkar-i-Wallah; Sarkar Khalsaji
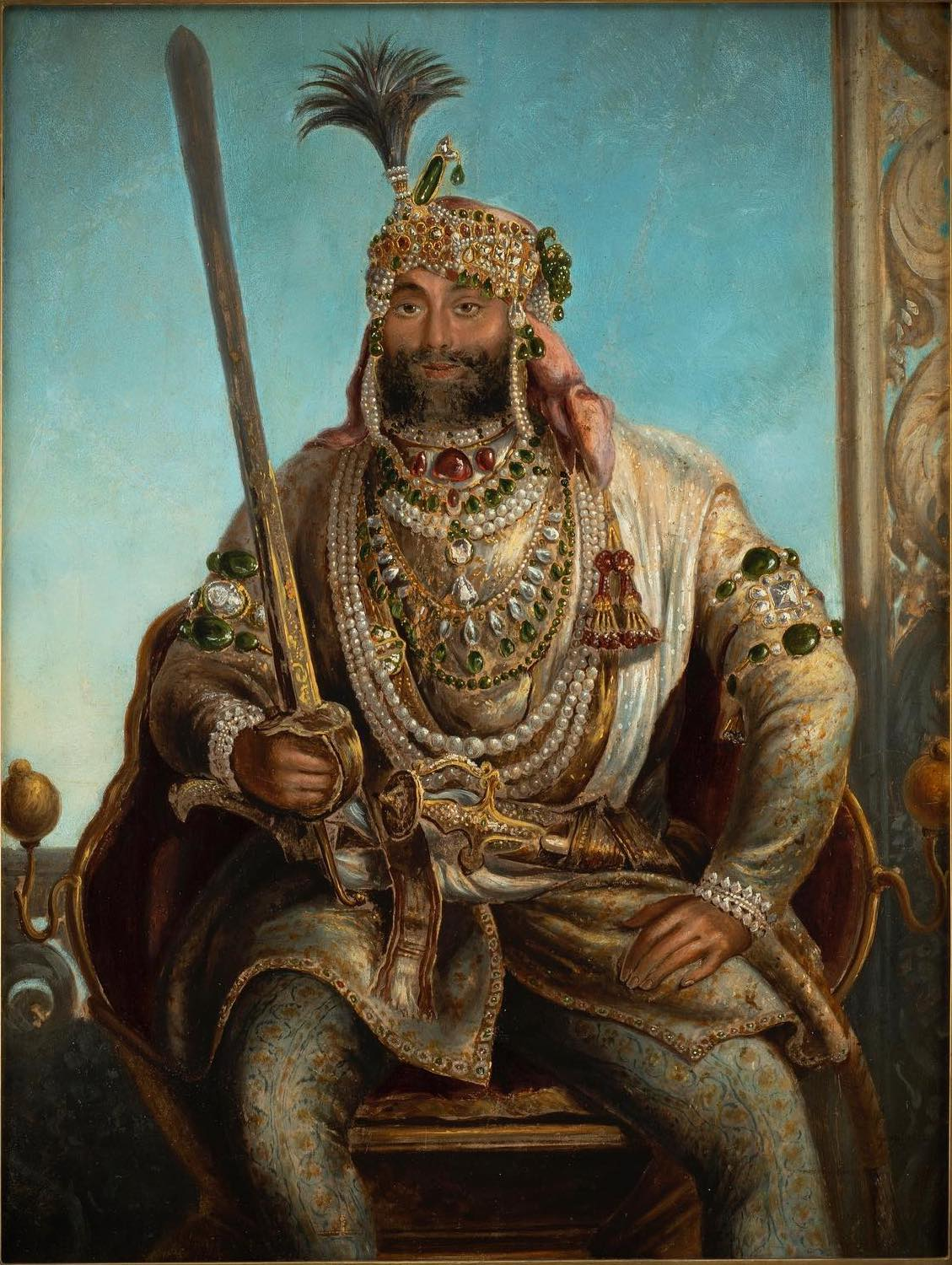
- Painting of Maharaja Sher Singh wearing the Koh-i-Noor diamond (on his right bicep), by August Schoefft, c. 1841–42

Maharaja of Punjab, Kashmir and Jammu
- Reign: 18 January 1841 – 15 September 1843
- Coronation: 27 January 1841; Lahore Fort, Lahore
- Predecessor: Nau Nihal Singh (as monarch until 1840); Chand Kaur (as regent in 1840–1841)
- Successor: Duleep Singh
- Prime minister: Dhian Singh Dogra
- Born: 4 December 1807: Batala, Sikh Empire; (present-day Gurdaspur district, Punjab, India)
- Died: 15 September 1843 (aged 35): Shah Bilawal Baradari, Lahore, Sikh Empire; (present-day Kot Khawaja Saeed, Lahore, Punjab, Pakistan)
- Consort: Prem Kaur Waraich (m. 1822)
- Issue: By Maharani Prem Kaur: * Yuvraj Pratap Singh Bahadur; By Maharani Pratap Kaur: * Kanwar Deva Singh Bahadur; By Maharani Dakno Kaur: * Shahdeo Singh Bahadur
- House: Sukerchakia
- Father: Maharaja Ranjit Singh of Punjab
- Mother: Mehtab Kaur Kanhaiyā
- Religion: Sikhism
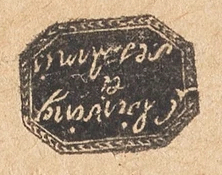
- Seal or stamp of approval

Sher Singh (4 December 1807 – 15 September 1843) was the fourth Maharaja of the Sikh Empire. He was elder of the twins of Maharaja Ranjit Singh, founder of the Sikh Empire and Maharani Mehtab Kaur. His reign began on 18 January 1841 following his assault on Lahore which ended the brief regency of Maharani Chand Kaur. He was assassinated on 15 September 1843 by Ajit Singh Sandhawalia, a relative. His short reign only lasted for two years. An experienced military-man, Sher Singh had the backing of the Sikh Army.

== Early life ==
Sher Singh was the son of Maharaja Ranjit Singh and Maharani Mehtab Kaur, he had a younger twin brother Tara Singh (1807–1859). (Note: Mehtab Kaur, who was also known as Mahitab Kaur, is not to be confused with Maharani Mahtab Devi Sahiba, another wife, who committed sati in 1839 with Ranjit Singh's body lying with his head on her lap.) He was the second son of Ranjit Singh.

In 1820, Maharaja Ranjit Singh granted him the privilege of being seated in the Darbar and bestowed civil and military honors on him. From 1831 to 1834 he acted as Governor of Kashmir and in 1834 he was a commander of the force that captured Peshawar from the Afghans. During his governorship, a famine broke out in 1831 which caused the population to drop from 800,000 to 200,000.

== Military campaigns ==
Barelvi declared jihad against the Sikhs and established a camp in Balakot. Along with Shah Ismail Dehlvi and his tribesmen, in 1831, Sher Singh accompanied by Pratab Singh Attarwala and Akali Hanuman Singh arrived in Balakot. He invested Balakot on all sides. The Sikh slowly advanced narrowing the besieged area gradually. On reaching near the Sayyid residence, the Sikh drew out their swords, cut down the sayyid troops and shot down Sayyid Ahmed Khan. His head cut off for display, and about 500 followers of Sayyid were killed including Shah Ismail Dehlvi. The entire property of Sayyid fell into the hands of Sikhs. A sum of Rs. 50,000 along with a letter of appreciation was sent to Sher Singh promising an additional Jagir.

== Reign ==
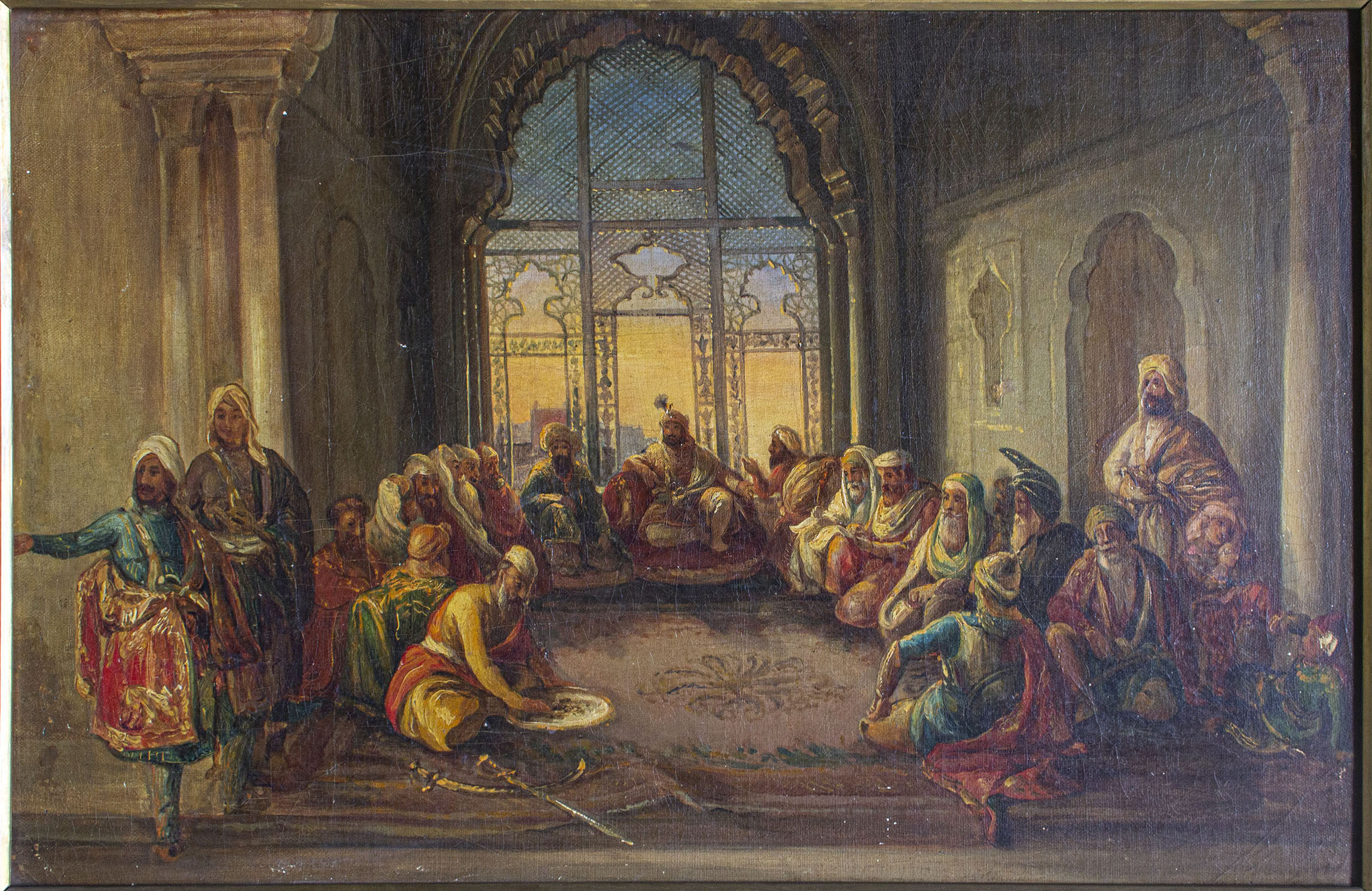
Maharaja Sher Singh seated, attended by his Council in the Tambi-khana room of the Shish Mahal section of the Lahore Fort, by August Schoefft, ca.1841–55.

He instigated the servant girls of Chand Kaur to murder her and marched to Lahore with his loyal troops to stake his claim to the Sikh throne in January 1841. Sher Singh became the maharaja on 27 January 1841, after the sudden death of Nau Nihal Singh whose death was set in motion, some say purposely while returning from his father's cremation. He was the half-brother of Nau Nihal Singh's father, former Maharaja Kharak Singh.

Proclaimed Maharaja by his wazir (prime minister) Dhian Singh Dogra, he won the throne after a protracted siege of the Lahore Fort which was held by the royal family. Thousands died in the siege.

Sher Singh had pro-British views, a continuation of his father's amicable ties to the British. An example of Sher Singh's pro-British sympathies is him allowing the British army to retreat from Afghanistan via Punjab in 1842. This is despite many of his officials wishing to raid the fatigued British during their Afghan retreat for spoils.

Sher Singh was a patron of the arts, with one of his court painters being Kehar Singh. The painter August Schoefft arrived in the Punjab and worked during his reign. Sher Singh was also a fan of wrestling and often would take wrestlers outside the walled city of Lahore to the tomb of Qasim Khan. One of these wrestlers were Sultan Muhammad, who later became a contractor under the British colonial administration.

Sher Singh initiated a communal cleaning (Kar Seva) of the Amrit Sarovar of the Golden Temple complex (first known to have been cleaned in such a manner under Phula Singh in 1800) but died before it could be fully carried out.

== Death ==
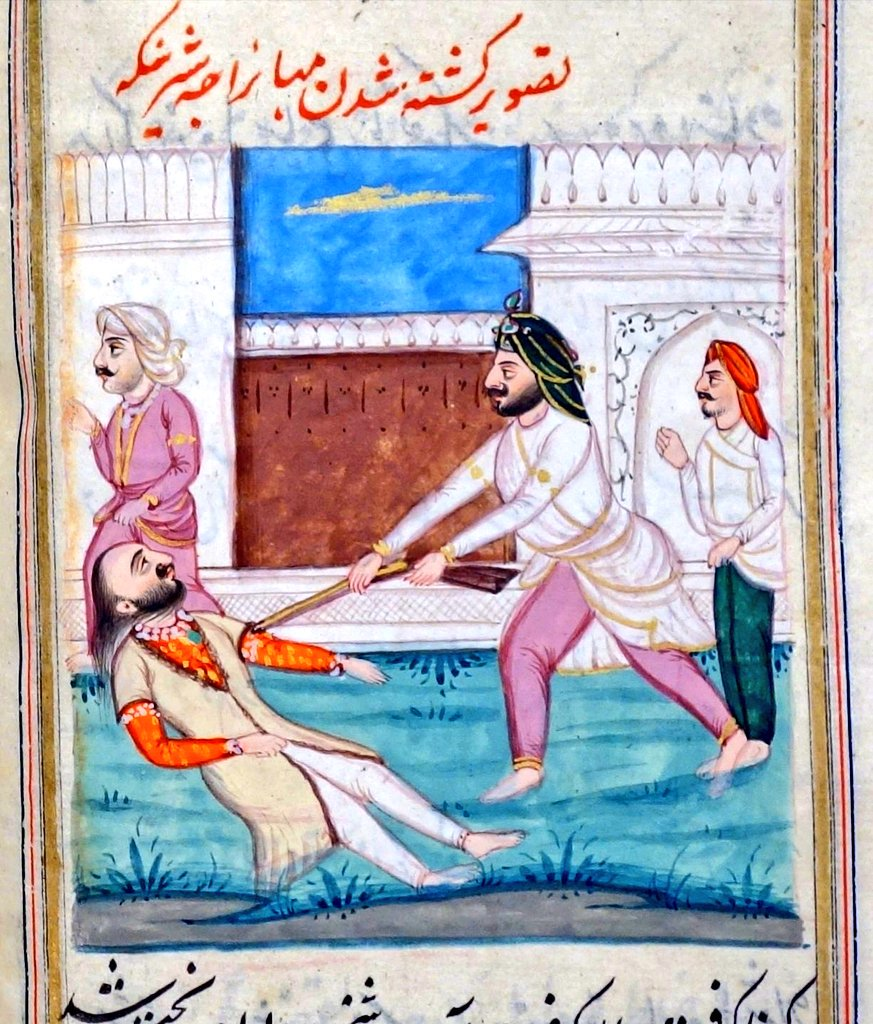
Depiction of the assassination of Maharaja Sher Singh by the Sandhawalia Sardars

A plan to assassinate Sher Singh was formulated by Lehna Singh Sandhawalia, Ajit Singh Sandhawalia, and Dhian Singh. However, how he was killed is disputed by historians, with there being two existing theories. The first claim is that Sher Singh was killed while inspecting cavalry, with his severed head being paraded on a pole. Another claim is that Sher Singh was murdered inside his palace, with his son Partap Singh and his queens in the zenana being killed soon after.

The second theory is as follows: Sher Singh was killed in September 1843 at Shah Bilawal Baradari in Lahore, while he was asked to inspect a new shotgun brought by Ajit Singh Sandhawalia. Sandhawalia then pulled the trigger and then killed the wounded Sher Singh with his sword by cutting off his head. Ajit Singh Sandhawalia had served as Prime Minister first for Ranjit Singh then for Sher Singh's brother Kharak Singh then Kharak Singh's son Nau Nihal each of whom had died shortly after taking office. Ajit Singh Sandhawalia then served as Prime Minister for Kharak Singh's widow Chand Kaur, who served as regent. Ajit Singh Sandhawalia preferred having Chand Kaur as regent ruler as it allowed him more power. Chand Kaur had been removed as the expected heir her late son Nau Nihal's daughter- in-law was about to deliver died stillborn. Sher Singh only had time to utter, "what treachery." The Sandhawalias also murdered Dhian Singh. The Sandhawalias were thought to have also had designs on the empire.

Immediately after murdering Sher Singh, the Sandhawalias murdered Sher Singh's son Partap Singh. Sher Singh and his son Partap Singh were both cremated together at Shah Bilowal Baradari in Lahore.

== Family ==
=== Wives ===
According to Priya Atwal, the known wives of Sher Singh are:

- Prem Kaur, daughter of Hari Singh, a Jatt zamindar of Mouza Luddhewala in Gujranwala, married 1822, given a pension of Rs. 7,200. Had a son named Pratap Singh, who was murdered in 1843. Later adopted a son named Narain Singh post-annexation in 1849.
- Partap Kaur (died August 1857), daughter of sardar Jugut Singh of Kot Kapura, married 1825, given a pension of Rs. 5,400. Adopted a cousin's son named Thakoor Singh in 1847, who went on to marry a Jatt woman who was the daughter of a zamindar from Nabha State.
- Golee, former prostitute from Gurdaspur, married 1832, given a pension of Rs. 3,600
- Kundo, daughter of Jatt zamindar of a village near Kangra, originally sent as slave-girl in 1829 from Kangra, married 1841, given a pension of Rs. 1,260
- Dukhno, daughter of a Chang zamindar, purportedly presented to Sher Singh by a kardar at Kangra, married 1842, given a pension of Rs. 9,000, resided in Benaras from July 1856 onwards, had a son named Shiv Deo Singh
- Dhurm Kaur Rundhavee, possibly married in 1841, given a pension of Rs. 7,200, may have adopted a son (Note: According to pension records, Dhurm Kaur Rundhavee and Chund Kaur were supposedly originally the wives of Tara Singh, Sher Singh’s brother; however, they are mentioned as having joined Sher Singh’s zenana once he became the maharaja.)
- Chund Kaur, possibly married in 1842, reportedly had an illegitimate son of Sher Singh named Dewa Singh who was born in 1838 (Note: According to pension records, Dhurm Kaur Rundhavee and Chund Kaur were supposedly originally the wives of Tara Singh, Sher Singh’s brother; however, they are mentioned as having joined Sher Singh’s zenana once he became the maharaja.)

=== Issues ===
The known male issues of Sher Singh were:

- Partap Singh (murdered in 1843), son of Prem Kaur
- Shahdeo Singh, son of Dukhno, he was awarded a jagir worth Rs. 10,000 outside of Punjab after 1849
- Dewa Singh (born 1838), son of Chund Kaur

== Legacy ==
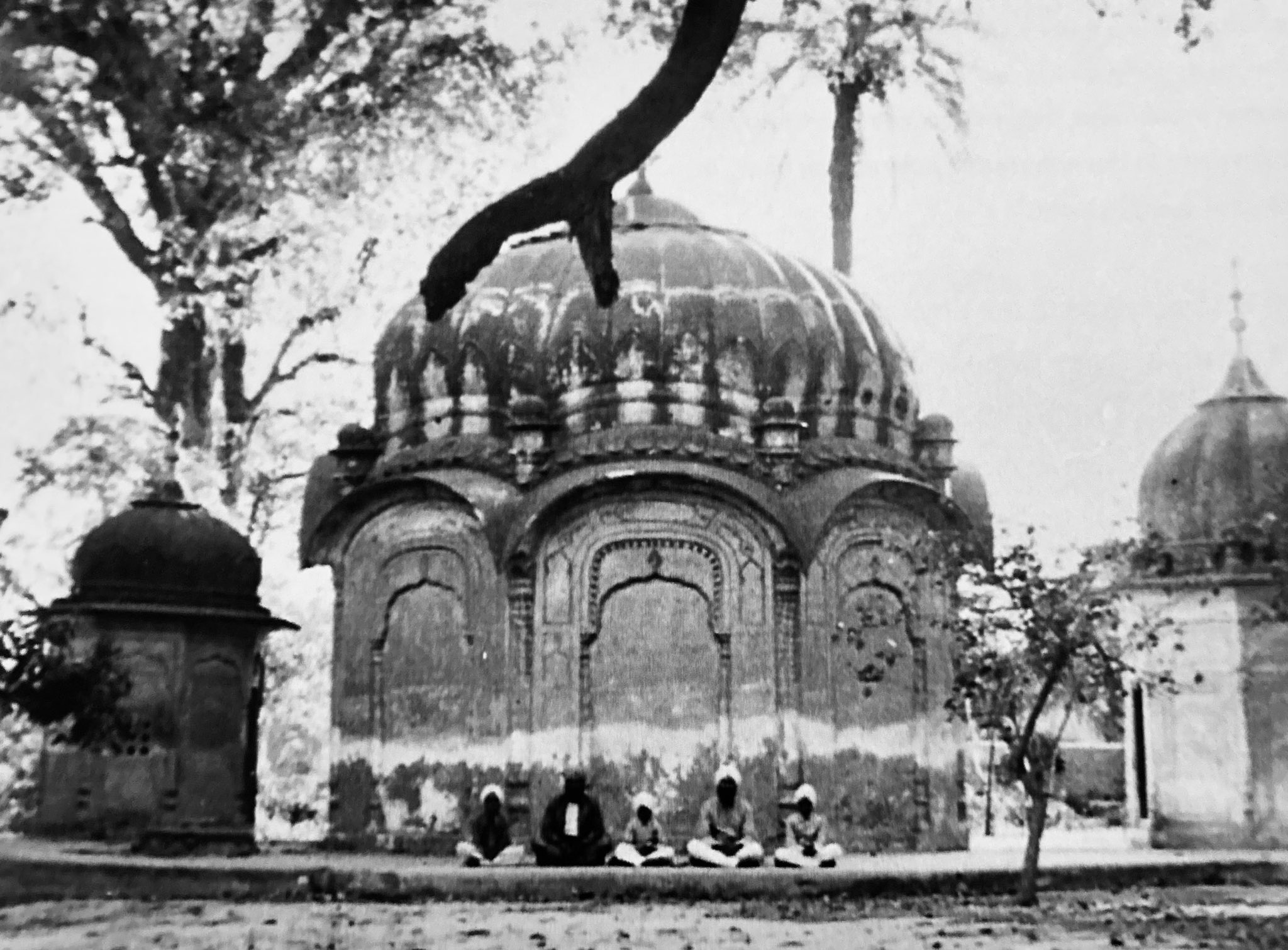
Photograph of the samadhs of Maharaja Sher Singh of the Sikh Empire and his two wives, Shah Bilawal, Lahore, ca.1900

The samadhi of Sher Singh is located in the Shah Bilawal Baradari in Lahore (31°35'39.5"N 74°21'19.1"E), where his son Partap Singh's samadhi is also located. His palace is leased to Baring Union Christian College.

== Notes ==
Preceded by Chand Kaur as regent	Maharaja of the Sikh Empire; 18 January 1841– 15 September 1843	Succeeded by Duleep Singh
