= Preminder Singh Sandhawalia =

Indian writer

Preminder Singh Sandhawalia is a Punjabi author.

== Works ==
His first book, published in 1999, was Noblemen and Kinsmen History of a Sikh Family.

His second book Beyond Identity was released in 2007, and is about his people. It attempts to describe a new path that the Sikh community should follow in the years to be a model people.

Sandhawalia's third book, CELEBRITY: Its Changing Face in India Through the Ages was published in May 2012, and it examines the idea of celebrity in Indian culture through the ages. He explores why celebrity, an honour once accorded to those who performed great feats or provided great service, is now given to entertainers, and hopes his book will encourage readers to “… move away from being mere spectators who indolently look to entertainers to amuse them and return to appreciation of meritocracy and morality.”

== Books ==
- Noblemen and Kinsmen: History of a Sikh Family, Munshiram Manoharlal Publisher, ISBN 81-215-0914-9 (1997)
- Beyond Identity, Singh Brothers, ISBN 978-8172053956 (2007)
- Celebrity: its Changing Face in India Through the Ages, AuthorHouse UK, ISBN 978-1468577686 (2012)
