= Nau Nihal Singh =

Maharaja of the Sikh Empire from 1839 to 1840

- Maharaja of Punjab; Maharaja of Lahore; Kaukab-i-Iqbal-i-Punjab; Sarkar-i-Wallah; Sarkar Khalsaji
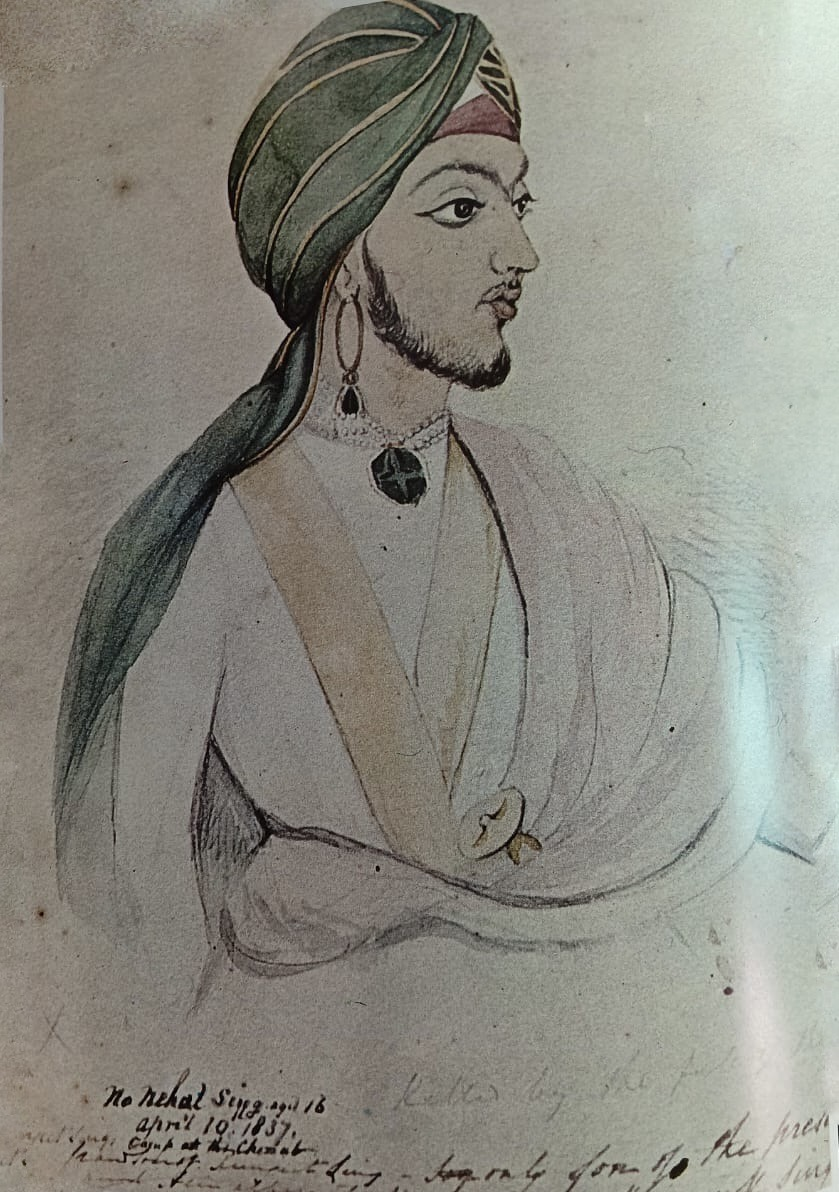
- Portrait sketch of Nau Nihal Singh at the age of sixteen, drawn in camp by the Chenab River by Godfrey Thomas Vigne on April 10th, 1837

Maharaja of Punjab, Kashmir and Jammu
- Reign: 8 October 1839 – 5 November 1840
- Predecessor: Kharak Singh
- Successor: Chand Kaur (as regent in 1840–1841); Sher Singh (as monarch from 1841)
- Born: 11 February 1821; Lahore, Sikh Empire (present-day Punjab, Pakistan)
- Died: 5 November 1840 (aged 19); Lahore, Sikh Empire (present-day Punjab, Pakistan)
- Consort: Nanaki Kaur Atariwala
- Spouses: Sahib Kaur Gilwaliwala; Bhadauran Kanwar; Katochan Kanwar
- Issue: Shahzada Jawahar Singh; Shahzada Bhagwan Singh (adopted)
- House: Sukerchakia
- Father: Kharak Singh
- Mother: Chand Kaur
- Religion: Sikhism

Maharaja Nau Nihal Singh (11 February 1821 – 5 November 1840) was the third maharaja of the Sikh Empire, ruling from 1839 until his death in 1840. He was the only son of Maharaja Kharak Singh and his consort, Maharani Chand Kaur. He was known as Kunwar Nau Nihal Singh, Kunwar Bhanwar Sa (respected young prince), or Yuvraj Shri Tikka Kanwar. His reign began with the dethronement of his father Maharaja Kharak Singh and ended with his death at the age of 19 on the day of his father's funeral.

== Early life ==
Nau Nihal Singh was born on 11 February 1821, to Yuvraj Kharak Singh and his first wife, Chand Kaur. He was the grandson of Sher-e-Punjab Maharaja Ranjit Singh and Maharani Datar Kaur of the Nakai Misl, he grew up very close to his grandparents. His father was the heir of his grandfather - thus making him second in line of succession to the throne of Punjab.

In April 1837, at the age of sixteen, he was married to Bibi Nanaki Kaur Atariwala, daughter of Sham Singh Attariwala (1790–1846) of the village of Attari in Amritsar district of Punjab. She was the only wife to hold the title of Maharani, she died in 1856. His wedding was planned by his grandmother, Datar Kaur. The occasion was marked by a display of extraordinary splendour and lavishness. He was secondly, married to Sahib Kaur Gilwaliwala, daughter of Sardar Gurdit Singh Gilwaliwala, of Amritsar. She died in 1841 after giving birth to a stillborn son. His third marriage was to Bhadauran Kanwar Sahiba, daughter of a Sardar of Bhadaur. His last wife was Katochan Sahiba, daughter of Mian Rai Singh, of Lambagraon. His last two wives committed Sati in Lahore on 6 November 1840 on his funeral pyre.

== Military campaigns and administration ==
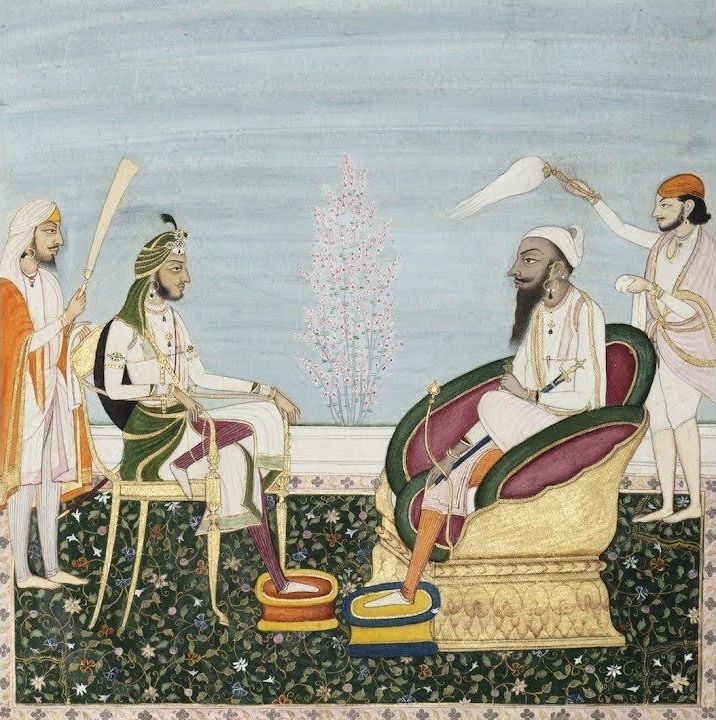
Painting of Maharaja Kharak Singh (right) with his son Nau Nihal Singh (left)

Like his father, he was brought him up in his family's martial tradition and assigned to a variety of military expeditions. At the age of 13 in 1834 he participated in the Peshawar campaign. He was then appointed to administer the country in the Attock region. The same year, the province of Peshawar was farmed out to him for an annual payment of Rs 12,00,000. In 1835, he suppressed a revolt in the Derajat and Torik.

In 1836, he accompanied his father to the borders of Sindh to confront the Talpurian umara. He took part in the operations of the Khyber in April 1839, he commanded a Sikh army which proceeded to Peshawar to assist Colonel Wade`s contingent on its march from Punjab to Kabul across the Khyber Pass.

In 1837, he was awarded with Kaukab-i-Iqbal-i-Punjab by Maharaja Ranjit Singh. Upon his father's ascension, he became the Tikka Kanwar (Crown prince) of Sarkār-ē-Khālsā. Nau Nihal was raised outside the court politics at Lahore however at the age of eighteen, and forced by his father's incapacity, he returned to Lahore. He was instructed to govern in the name of his father under the direction of the vizier, Dhian Singh Dogra. When Kharak Singh became gravely ill, the court physician Johann Martin Honigberger noted that despite his father begging him to see him every day, Nau Nihal rarely visited his father.

== Death ==
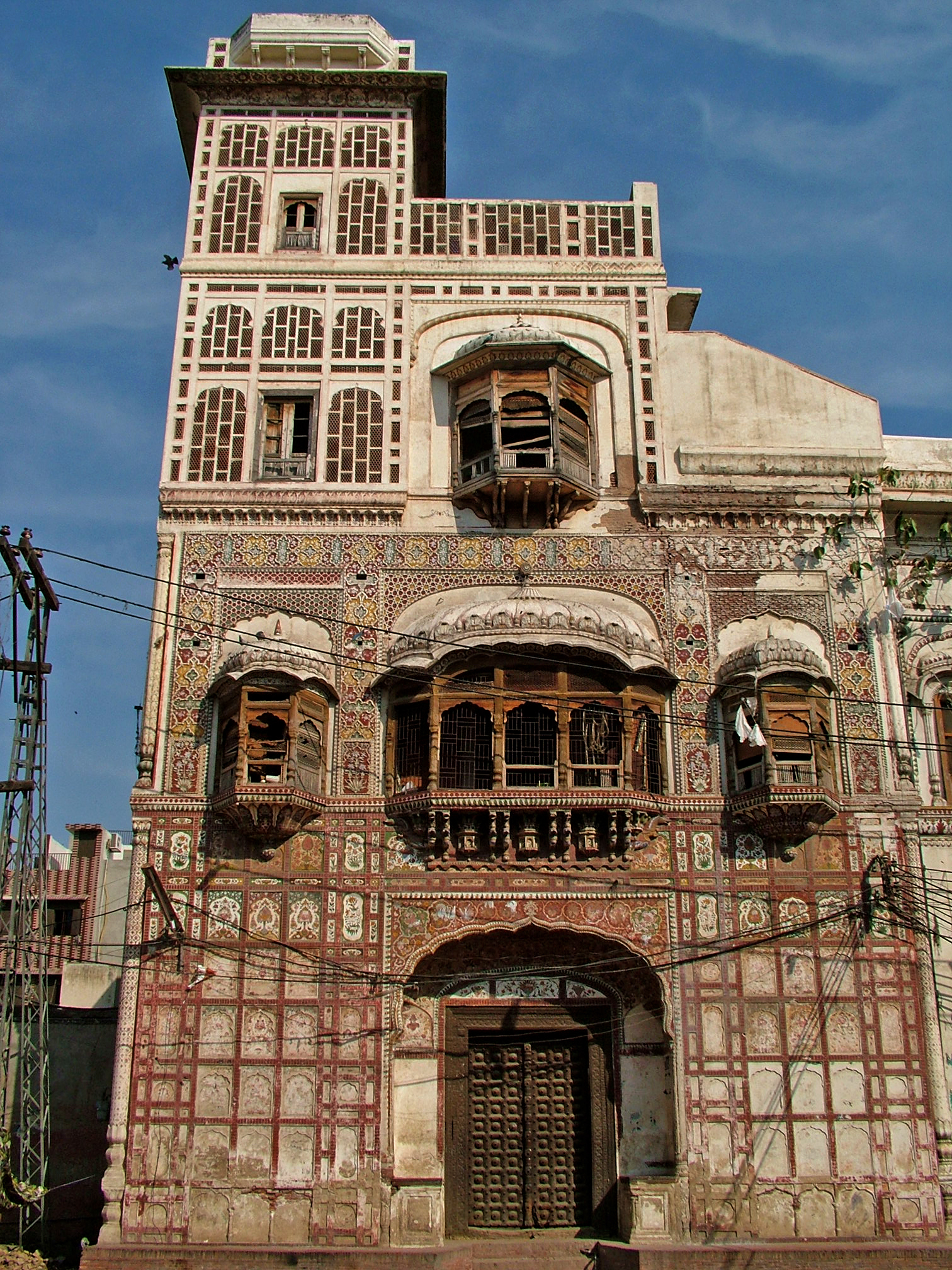
The Haveli of Nau Nihal Singh is located in Lahore, Pakistan.

Nau Nihal was popular with the royal courtiers and the general public, and was seen as a worthy successor to his father during the latter's sickness. After Kharak Singh died on 5 November 1840, Nau Nihal performed his last rites beside the Ravi River in Lahore. After the ceremony, he started returning to the palace via the Hazuri Bagh, where a massive block of stone from a gate fell upon him and two of his companions. One of the companions - Udham Singh (nephew of Dhian Singh)- broke his neck and died on the spot.

According to Alexander Gardner, who was just steps behind Nau Nihal when the incident took place, the prince had sustained only minor injuries during this episode: he was well enough to walk on his own, and agreed to be taken on a stretcher only because of Gardner's insistence. However, when the court physician Johann Martin Honigberger came to attend to Nau Nihal in a tent, he observed that the prince's skull had been crushed, and the bedsheet was covered with blood and brain tissue. Dhian Singh insisted that the prince had suffered these injuries during the alleged accident in Hazuri Bagh. Nau Nihal died hours later, although the courtiers did not make this news public until three days later in an attempt to avoid panic. According to Gardner, five artillery men had carried Nau Nihal from Hazuri Bagh to the tent: two of these men died under mysterious circumstances, two went on leave and never re-joined the service, and one disappeared without explanation. L.H. Griffin in The Punjab Chiefs says, "The only reason for the mystery which shrouded the death-bed of the Prince, was the necessity which Dhyan Singh felt for keeping the fatal news from being generally known until the arrival of Sher Singh. If there had been an organised plot, the Raja would have taken care that Sher Singh should have been present in Lahore at the time of the catastrophe. The absence of Sher Singh proves the innocence of the Raja (Dhian Singh)".

The contemporary English political correspondence, which details even the most insignificant happenings at the Darbar, makes no references to any suspicion entertained in any quarters regarding the Jammu Rajas. It has been asserted that as far as contemporary European writers go, it was their studied policy to denounce the Jammu Rajas, especially Dhian Singh, because of his anti-European attitude which he had consistently maintained throughout his career. On enquiry into the matter of the 'accident', J.M. Honigberger found "more reason to suppose that the partisans of Kurruck Singh and Chet Singh were the authors of this plot against the prince, as he had intended to ask them for an account of their perfidious behaviour during his father's long illness... He (the prince) to order seven of their houses to be closed and inquiries to be made".

Nau Nihal was cremated on 6 November 1840 at the age of 19. Two of his wives, Bhadauran Kaur and Katochan Kaur, reputedly committed sati. His mother Maharani Chand Kaur became the Empress of Sikh Empire assuming the title Malika Muqaddasa (immaculate empress). She was battered to death with wooden spikes by her servants on 11 June 1842.

== Succession ==
After Nau Nihal's death, a court faction proclaimed his uncle Sher Singh as the rightful heir, while another declared his mother Chand Kaur as the ruler. The faction supporting Chand Kaur hoped that Nau Nihal's pregnant wife would give birth to a son. However, the widow gave birth to a stillborn baby six months later, and Sher Singh besieged Lahore with a 70,000-strong army. Ultimately, Chand Kaur agreed to acknowledge Sher Singh's claim to the throne in return for a generous settlement and safe passage, and Sher Singh was crowned on 18 January 1841. A few months later, on 11 June 1842, Chand Kaur's maids killed her by crushing her skull, just like her son had died. While being punished by Prime Minister Dhian Singh, they insisted that they had killed Chand Kaur on Sher Singh's orders.

Nau Nihal Singh had ordered the construction of a bunga (tower) in the complex of Tarn Taran Sahib, one of the Holiest Sikh Shrines in the Majha Region of Punjab Kingdom.

== Child adoptions ==
When Nau Nihal Singh was declared as Maharaja of Sikh Empire, he adopted his cousin's son, Bhagwan Singh from the Kanhaiya Misl.

His second wife, Sahib Kaur was pregnant at the time of his death and posthumously gave birth to their son, Jawahar Singh who was a stillborn. It is alleged that she was poisoned with the motive of terminating her pregnancy. Sohan Lal Suri claimed that Sher Singh gave the wives of Nau Nihal Singh medicines to terminate their pregnancies.

== Wives ==
According to Priya Atwal, the known wives of Nau Nihal Singh are:

- Nanki Kaur (died November 1856), daughter of Sham Singh Attariwala, married 1837, given a pension of Rs. 4,600
- Sahib Kaur (died 1841), daughter of Gurdit Singh Gilwaliwala of Amritsar
- Bhadauran Kaur (purportedly died in 1840 by sati), daughter of a sardar of Bhadaur
- Katochan Kaur (purportedly died in 1840 by sati), daughter of Rai Singh, the illegitimate son of Mian Fateh Singh of Lambagraon.

== Legacy ==
The samadhi of Nau Nihal Singh is located in Lahore near the samadhis of his grandfather, Ranjit Singh, and father, Kharak Singh. The Haveli of Nau Nihal Singh is located in Lahore.

Preceded by Kharak Singh	Maharaja of the Sikh Empire; 8 October 1839 – 6 November 1840	Succeeded by Chand Kaur as regent
