= Prem Kaur =

Queen consort of the Sikh Empire

Prem Kaur Warraich
- Maharani of Sikh Empire; Maharani Sahiba

Maharani consort of Punjab, Kashmir and Jammu
- Tenure: 18 January 1841 – 15 September 1843
- Predecessor: Nanaki Kaur Atariwala
- Successor: Bamba Müller (titular)
- Born: 1809; Gujranwala, Punjab, Sikh Empire
- Died: 1874 (aged 64–65); Lahore, Punjab, British India
- Spouse: Sher Singh (m. 1822; died 1843)
- Issue: Yuvraj Pratap Singh
- House: Sukerchakia (by marriage)
- Father: Hari Singh Waraich

Maharani Prem Kaur, was the queen consort of Maharaja Sher Singh, the fourth Maharaja of the Sikh Empire. She was the daughter of Lambardar Hari Singh Warraich, a Jat Sikh of the village of Ladhewala Waraich, in Gujranwala district of the Punjab. In 1822 she was married to Prince Sher Singh, the elder of the twins of Maharani Mehtab Kaur and Maharaja Ranjit Singh, founder of the Sikh Empire.

In 1831, she gave birth to Partap Singh. Installed as heir apparent with the title of Tikka Sahib Yuvraj Bahadur (Crown Prince) at Lahore Fort, 27 January 1841. He was later brutally murdered by Sardar Lahina Singh Sandhanvalia, near Shalamar Bagh in Lahore on September 15, 1843, at the age of 12. Rani Prem Kaur survived her husband and was granted an annual pension of Rs 7,200 by the British after the Annexation of Sikh Empire by the British Raj in 1849.

Sher Singh was succeeded by his five-year-old brother, Duleep Singh as the Maharaja and his mother, Jind Kaur as regent.
