= Chand Kaur =

Queen regent of the Sikh Empire from 1840 to 1841

- Rajmata of Sikh Empire; Malika Muqaddasa; Empress Immaculate
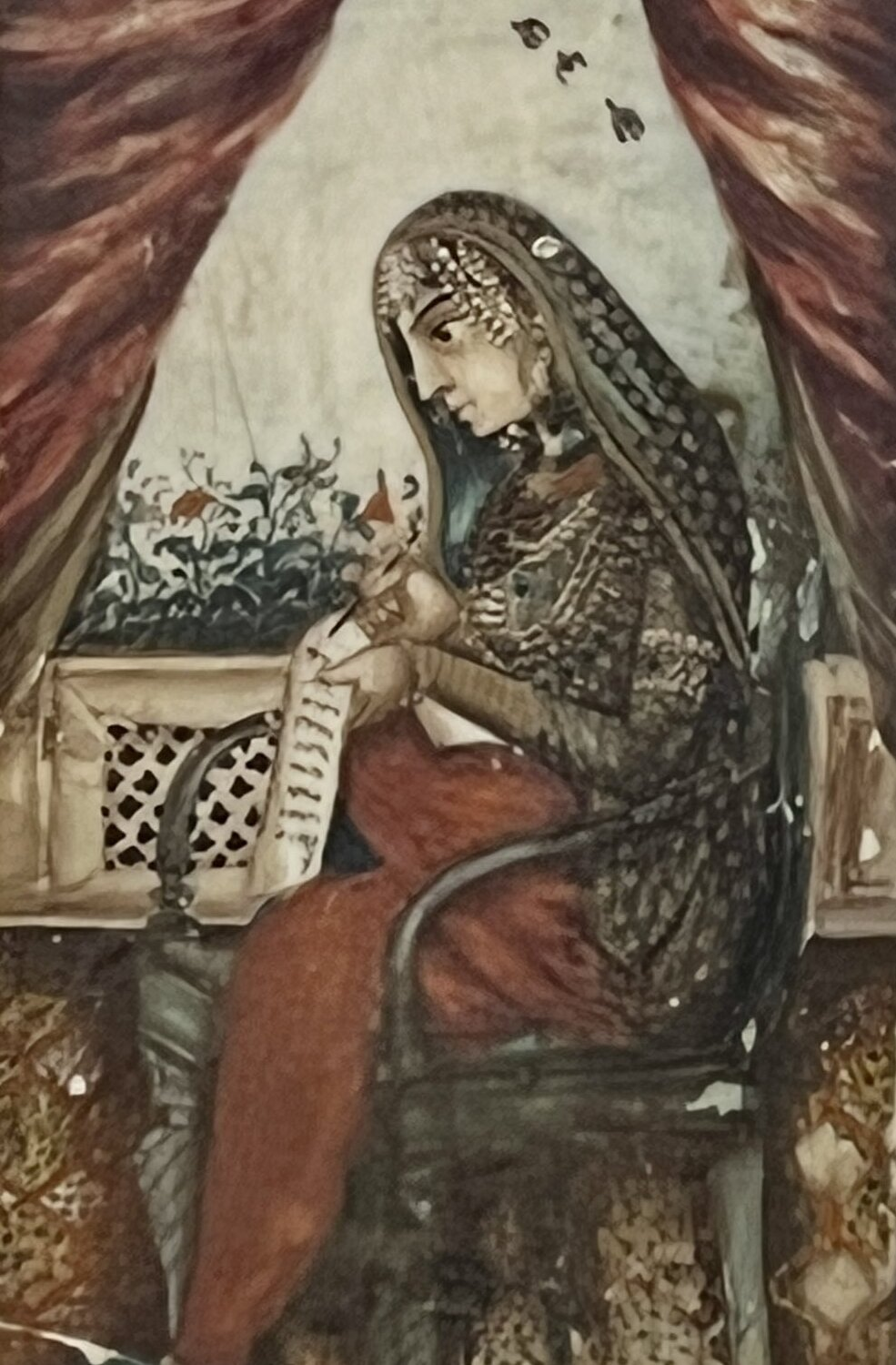
- Maharani Chand Kaur writing, gouache on paper, Lahore Museum, c. 1850

Maharani consort of Punjab, Kashmir and Jammu
- Tenure: 1 September 1839 – 8 October 1839
- Predecessor: Datar Kaur
- Successor: Nanaki Kaur Atariwala

Maharani regent of the Punjab, Kashmir and Jammu
- Regency: 5 November 1840 – 18 January 1841
- Coronation: 2 December 1840; Lahore Fort, Lahore
- Predecessor: Nau Nihal Singh (as monarch)
- Successor: Sher Singh (as monarch)
- Born: 1802; Fatehgarh Churian, Punjab, Sikh Empire (present-day Gurdaspur district, Punjab, India)
- Died: 11 June 1842 (aged 39–40); Haveli of Nau Nihal Singh, Lahore, Punjab, Sikh Empire (present-day Punjab, Pakistan)
- Burial: Royal Garden, Lahore (Samadhi) (present day Islamia College Civil Lines)
- Spouse: Kharak Singh (m. 1812; died 1840)
- Issue: Nau Nihal Singh
- House: Kanhaiya (by birth); Sukerchakia (by marriage)
- Father: Sardar Jaimal Singh
- Mother: Rajkumari Sahib Kaur of Patiala (daughter of Maharaja Amar Singh)
- Religion: Sikhism

Chand Kaur (1802 – 11 June 1842) was the regent of the Sikh Empire, proclaimed as Malika Muqaddisa (lit. Queen Immaculate) on 2 December 1840. She was born to Sardar Jaimal Singh of the Kanhaiya Misl. In 1812, she was married to Crown Prince Kharak Singh, son and heir apparent of Maharaja Ranjit Singh and Maharani Datar Kaur. In 1821 she gave birth to their only son Nau Nihal Singh, who became second in line of succession to the throne of Punjab.

During her husband's brief reign she served as the queen consort of the Sikh Empire and became the Rajmata when her son ascended the throne.

After the deaths of both her husband Kharak Singh and son Nau Nihal Singh, she declared herself regent for the unborn child of Nau Nihal Singh and his pregnant widow Sahib Kaur. She ruled very briefly for a period of a month and a half. Her short rule was opposed by many sections of the Sikh establishment, some for misogynistic reasons. She abandoned her claim when Sahib Kaur delivered a stillborn son and rival Sher Singh led a successful assault of Lahore. She was later murdered by her servants on 11 June 1842.

== Biography ==
Chand Kaur was born in 1802 into a Sandhu Jat Sikh family in Fatehgarh Churian in the Gurdaspur District of Punjab. Her father was Sardar Jaimal Singh, chief of the Kanhaiya Misl. In February 1812, at the age of ten, she married Kunwar Kharak Singh, the eldest son of Maharaja Ranjit Singh. In 1816, Ranjit Singh officially announced Kharak Singh as his heir apparent and anointed him "Tikka Kanwar" (Crown prince) making Chand Kaur the "Tikka Rani Sahiba" (Crown Princess).

Their son, Nau Nihal Singh, was born on 23 February 1821 and in March 1837 he married Bibi Nanaki Kaur Sahiba, daughter of Sham Singh Atariwala.

=== Reign of son ===
After the death of Ranjit Singh on 27 June 1839, Kharak Singh was appointed as his successor and Raja Dhian Singh Dogra as his wazir (vizier). The new Maharaja only ruled for less than four months until October 1839, when he was overthrown in a coup by his son, Nau Nihal Singh, and Dhian Singh. He was imprisoned at Lahore until his death in November 1840 from slow poisoning. Contemporary chroniclers suggest that the poison had been administered under Dhiān Siṅgh's orders.

Returning from the cremation of his father on 5 November, Nau Nihal Singh went through the gate of the Hazuri Bagh with his companion Udam Singh, son of Gulab Singh, and Dhian Singh's nephew. As they passed through the gate stones fell from above, killing Udam Singh and injuring the prince. Dhian Singh, who was a few steps behind, immediately arranged for the prince to be taken into the fort. Nobody else was allowed into the fort, not even his mother, Chand Kaur, who beat on the fort gates with her bare hands in a fever of anxiety. Eyewitnesses stated that before he was taken into the fort the prince appeared to be only slightly injured, was conscious and asked for water. However, when his mother and friends were allowed in to see him, he was dead with severe injuries to his head.

=== Rule ===
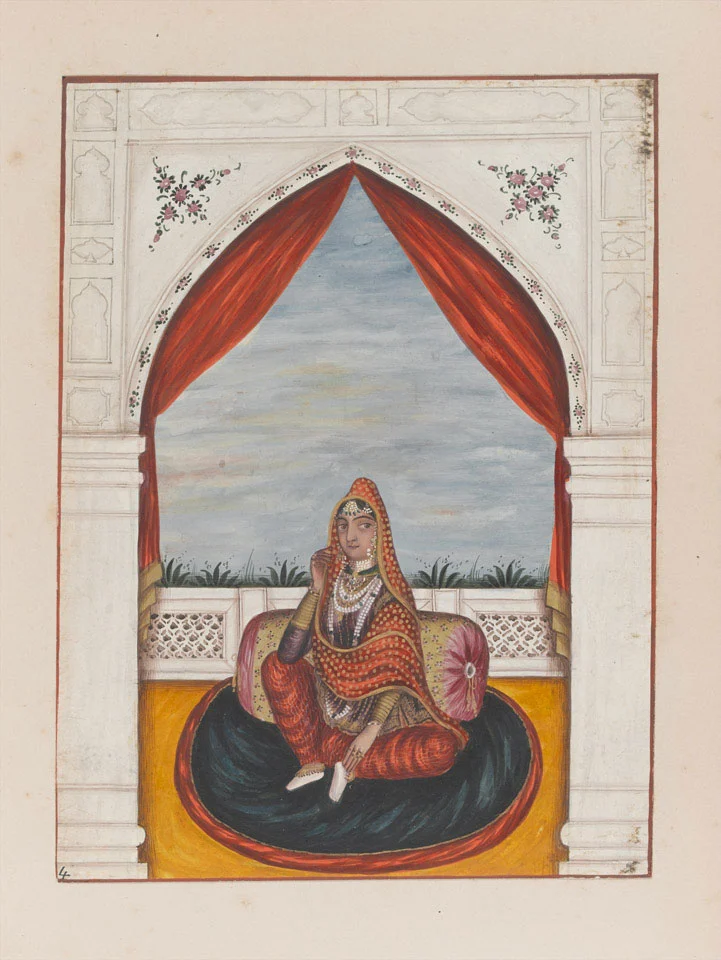
Maharani Chand Kaur. Watercolour by a Company artist, Punjab, ca.1865

After the deaths of Kharak Singh and Nau Nihal Singh, Dhian Singh supported the claim of Sher Singh, the son of Ranjit Singh's estranged first wife, Mehtab Kaur. Chand Kaur turned to Gulab Singh for support. A compromise was proposed that Chand Kaur should adopt Sher Singh's son Pratap Singh.

However, she said that Nau Nihal's widow, Maharani Sahib Kaur, was pregnant and might give birth to a rightful successor. The arrival in Lahore of two powerful opponents of Sher Singh, Sardar Atar Singh Sandhawalia and Sardar Ajit Singh Sandhawalia, settled the matter. On 2 December 1840 Chand Kaur was proclaimed Maharani of the Punjab, with the title Malika Muqaddasa. However, Bikram Singh, direct descendant of Guru Nanak, refused to apply tilok on her to enthrone her due to the fact she was a woman.

On 13 January, Sher Singh arrived in Lahore. The regiments outside the city walls went over to his side, leaving Chand Kaur with 5,000 men and a limited quantity of gunpowder against a force of 26,000 infantry, 8,000 horse and 45 guns. Chand Kaur's troops in the fort fought for two days, but Dhian Singh arrived on the evening of 17 January and arranged a ceasefire. Chand Kaur was persuaded to accept a pension and relinquish her claim to the throne, and on 27 January Sher Singh was formally anointed as Maharaja.

=== Retirement and assassination ===
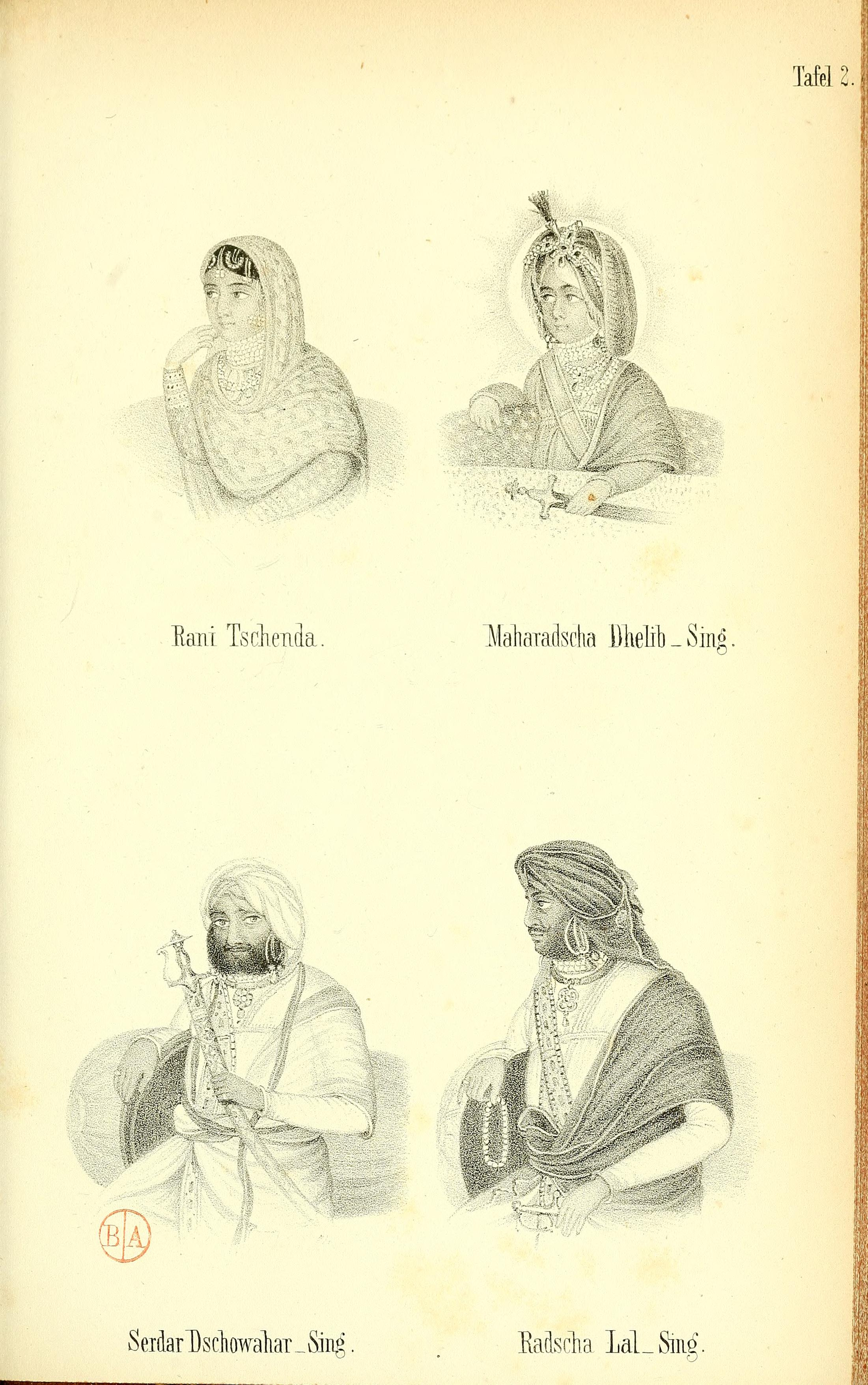
Rani Chand Kaur, Duleep Singh, Sardar Jawahar Singh & Raja Lal Singh

In July 1841 Sahib Kaur's son was stillborn, ending any justification for Chand Kaur's claim to the regency. The dowager Maharani retired to the haveli of Nau Nihal Singh, her son, in Lahore and received a pension of 900,000 rupees. However her enemies still saw her as a threat and she was battered to death with wooden pikes by her servants on 11 June 1842. Umdat-ut-Tawarikh, the chronological account of the reign of the Sukerchakia family by their historiographer Sohan Lal Suri states that she was murdered on the orders of her brother-in-law, Sher Singh and Prime Minister Dhian Singh. The account further states that Sher Singh ordered for "medicines" to be given to widows of her son to terminate their pregnancies to avoid any future claimants to the throne resulting in the death of her grandchild and daughter-in-law, Sahib Kaur. According to Abha Narain Lambah, Chand Kaur was murdered by her servant girls at the instigation of Sher Singh, with the pregnancy claim being deception.

== Legacy ==
Two samadhis dedicated to her are known, one near Gumat and another in Lahore. Her samadhi, Maharani Chand Kaur Samadhi, is located near Gumat, Jammu. A magnificent gurudwara, known as Gurudwara Maharani Chand Kaur, has also been built on the same premises and the adjoining neighborhood is known as Chand Nagar. Another of samadhi dedicated to Chand Kaur exists at The Royal Lahore Garden, to the south of her samadhi, stands the samadhi of her mother-in-law, Maharani Datar Kaur, lovingly called Mai Nakain by her father-in-law, Maharaja Ranjit Singh. Between the samadhis of the two maharanis is the smaller samadhi of her daughter-in-law, Maharani Sahib Kaur. The Lahori samadhi is nearby the Tomb of Anarkali and is now within the campus of Government Islamia College, Civil Lines.

== Notes ==
Preceded by Nau Nihal Singh as monarch	Maharani regent of the Sikh Empire; 5 November 1840 – 18 January 1841	Succeeded by Sher Singh as monarch
