= Johann Martin Honigberger =

Transylvanian Saxon medical doctor and traveller (1795–1869)

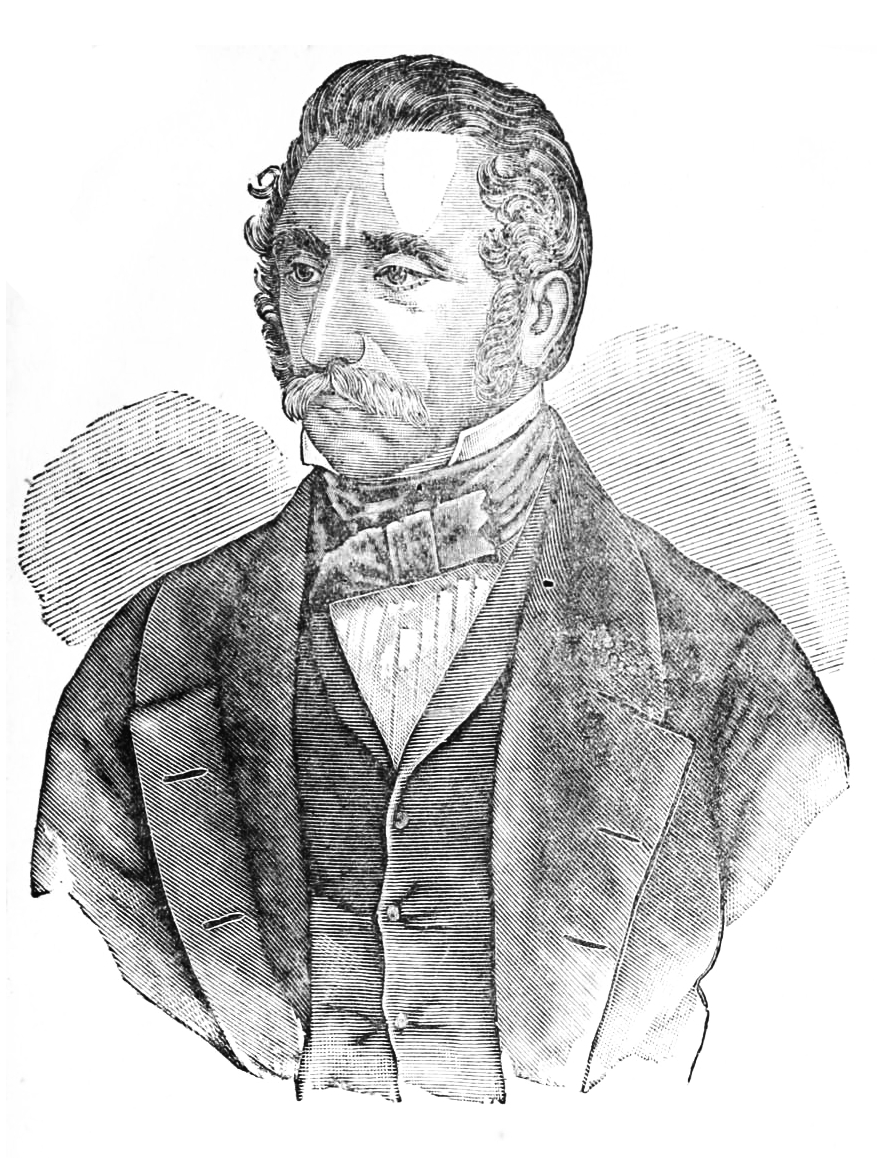
- Born: 10 March 1795; Kronstadt, Transylvania
- Died: 18 December 1869 (aged 74); Kronstadt, Austria-Hungary
- Medical career
- Profession: Medical doctor
- Notable works: Thirty-five Years in the East ... Relating to the Punjab and Cashmere ..., 1852

Johann Martin Honigberger (10 March 1795 – 18 December 1869) was a Transylvanian Saxon medical doctor and traveller. He travelled through Asia to India and wrote a book on his experiences in the East. A novel based on his life, written by Mircea Eliade in 1940, The Secret of Dr. Honigberger, became popular.

== Early life ==
Honigberger was born to a Transylvanian Saxon family in Kronstadt which was then part of the Principality of Transylvania. After training in medicine, Honigberger travelled to Constantinople in 1815 and over the following two years he travelled throughout the Levant, Egypt, Arabia and Persia as a government physician.

Whilst in Baghdad he learnt of the exploits of four European generals, Jean-François Allard, Paolo Avitabile, Claude Auguste Court and Jean-Baptiste Ventura who had thrived in the service of Maharajah Ranjit Singh. On being told of the need for medical personnel in the army Ranjit Singh was preparing, he obtained a reference letter and set out for Punjab.

== Punjab ==
In 1829, he arrived in Lahore which was then the capital of the Sikh Empire. He would remain in the Punjab for the next twenty years save for an interlude in Europe. During his time in the Punjab, he was fondly known as 'Martin Sahib'. In Lahore, he initially treated East India Company soldiers before he was able to attract the attention of the Ranjit Singh who made him a court physician.

In 1834, he returned to Europe, following the road across the Sulaiman Range from the Indus into Afghanistan. He was robbed at Bamyan, north of Kabul, but eventually made it through Russia to reach Europe once more. Between 1836 and 1838 he practiced medicine in Constantinople, experimenting with homeopathic remedies.

In 1838, he returned to Lahore at the request of Ranjit Singh. Despite winning the favour of Ranjit Singh, Honigberger held an unflattering opinion of the Maharaja, describing him as of very low stature. Ranjit Singh offered him command of an artillery battalion, but Honigberger refused on want of not being a soldier, eventually however he accepted an appointment as superintendent of the royal gunpowder factory.

He kept an account of his time in the Punjab, and noted that quarantine was frequently used in the management of plague in Punjab. In 1839 Honigberger was present at the funeral of Ranjit Singh, a ceremony he described as abominable, and of which he wrote a detailed account of the burning of four of his widows, and seven concubines. The following year he attended the funeral of Kharak Singh, describing it as horrid yet remarkable, in which three of Kharak Singh's widows were burnt alive along with eleven concubines.

== Plants ==
Honigberger was a keen plant collector and whilst in the India he compiled a materia medica of his discoveries. He is credited with organising the first botanical collections in Afghanistan, undertaken on a journey in 1833.

== Homeopathy ==
During his stay in Europe in the mid-1830s he met Samuel Hahnemann and was influenced by the idea of homeopathy. He became a student of homeopathy and is said to be responsible for its introduction to Asia, notably using homeopathic remedies to cure the Maharajah's paralysed vocal chords.
