= Dhian Singh =

Wazir of the Sikh Empire (1818–1843)

Raja Dhian Singh
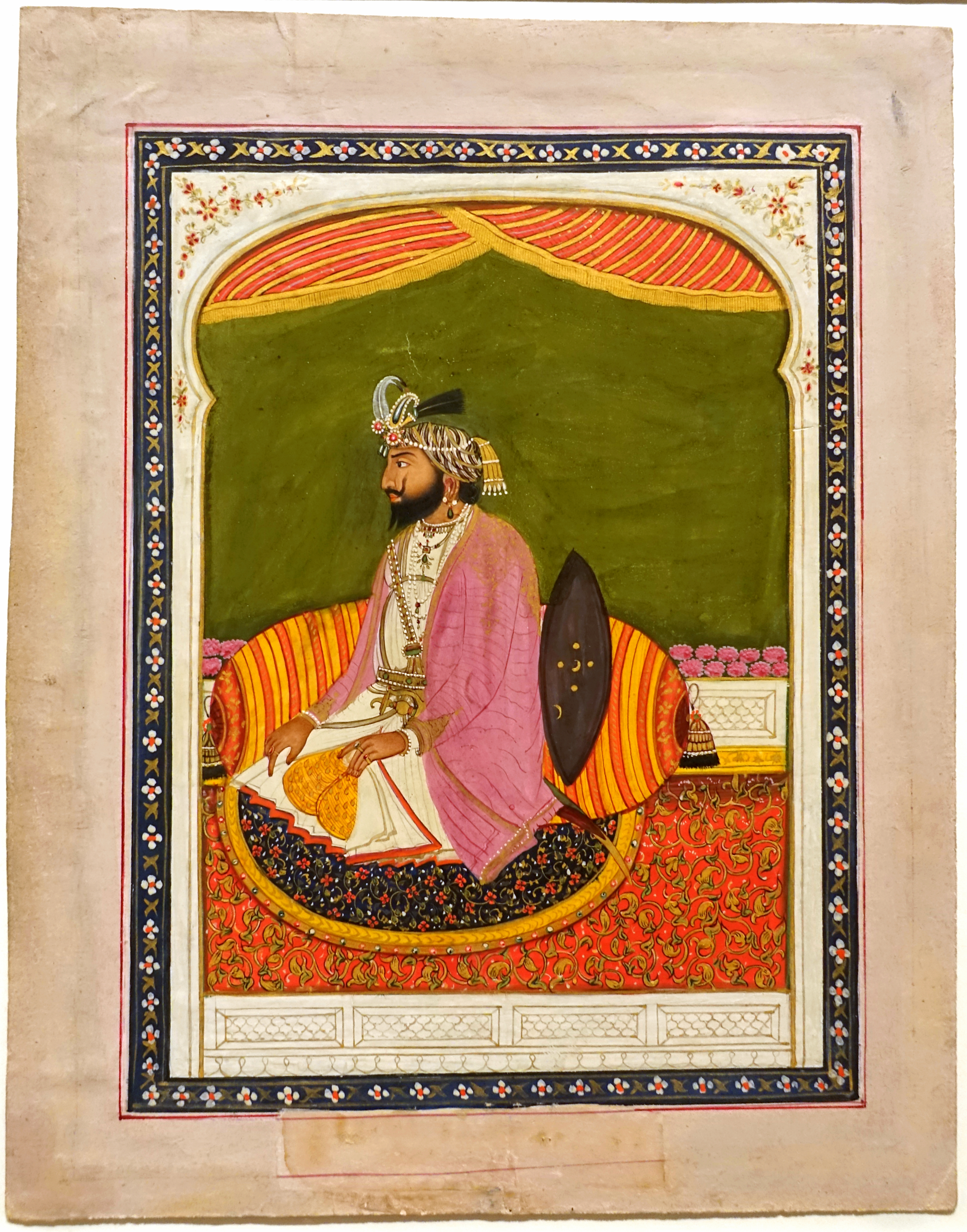
- Portrait of Raja Dhian Singh in opaque watercolor and gold on exhibit at the Tokyo National Museum. c. mid-19th century.

Wazir of the Sikh Empire
- In office 1818 – 15 September 1843
- Monarchs: Ranjit Singh; Kharak Singh; Nau Nihal Singh
- Preceded by: Khushal Singh Jamadar
- Succeeded by: Hira Singh Dogra

Personal details
- Born: 22 August 1796
- Died: 15 September 1843 (aged 47)

Raja Dhian Singh (22 August 1796 – 15 September 1843) was the longest serving wazir of the Sikh Empire, during the reign of Maharajah Ranjit Singh, and the brief rule of four of his successors over four years. He held the office for twenty five years, from 1818 till his assassination. Dhian Singh was a brother of Raja Gulab Singh of Jammu, who later founded the Dogra dynasty when he became Maharaja of the princely state of Jammu and Kashmir under the British Raj. Another brother Suchet Singh also served the empire. The three brothers were collectively known as the "Dogra brothers" in the Sikh Empire, based on their ethnicity.

== Biography ==
In the turbulent four years following the Ranjit Singh's death on 27 June 1839, Dhian remained at the helm, grappling with a power struggle in which three successive emperors and one empress died suddenly, in the build-up to the First Anglo-Sikh War.

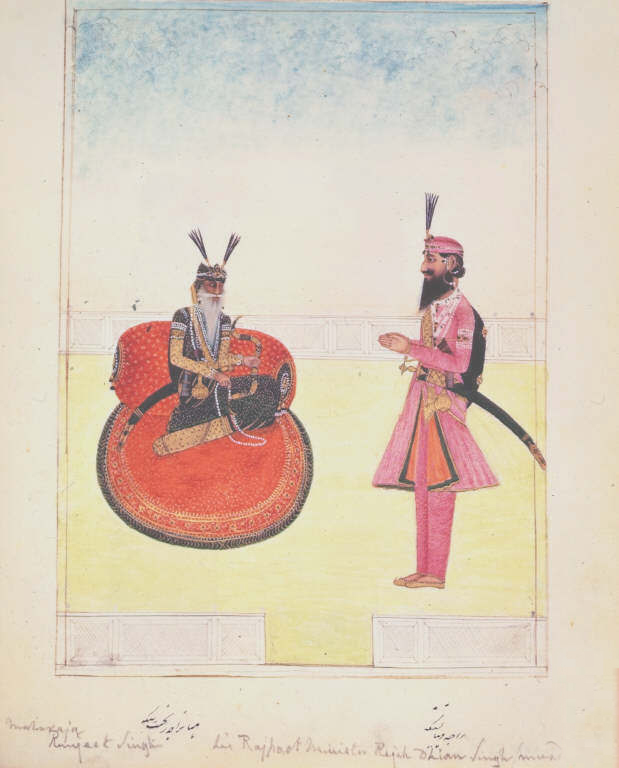
Maharaja Ranjit Singh, seated, with his prime minister Raja Dhian Singh in 1838.

Following the coronation of Kharak Singh on 1 September 1839, Dhian launched a palace coup on 8 October 1839, and assassinated Chet Singh Bajwa, the favourite courtier of the emperor. He imprisoned emperor Kharak, who later died of slow poisoning by lead and mercury. Dhian had spread rumor that the hedonistic emperor intended to sell out the sovereignty of the Sikh empire to the British East India Company.

Dhian then installed the emperor's son Nau Nihal Singh, aged eighteen, to the throne. Thirteen months later, Nau Nihal, died suddenly on 5 November 1840, on the day of his father's funeral. After leaving the funeral pyre, Nau Nihal was knocked unconscious when a stone gate at Lahore Fort collapsed upon him. Udham Singh, son of Dhian's brother Gulab Singh was killed in the same incident. Dhian had the teenage emperor carried indoors, and barred any visitors, including the emperor's mother Chand Kaur. Eyewitness accounts had initially reported the emperor had only suffered minor injuries from the accident, however later the emperor was pronounced dead when Dhian presented the corpse with its head smashed. American colonel Alexander Gardner, who was with Nau Nihal when he was injured, noted that five artillery men carried the emperor into the fort under the orders of Dhian. Two of these men died mysteriously, two asked for leave and never returned, and one inexplicably disappeared.

On 13 January 1841, another of Ranjit Singh's sons, Sher Singh, led a coup against Chand Kaur, and after two days of siege and battle, Dhian negotiated a ceasefire, which led to Chand Kaur's abdication, and Sher succeeding to the throne as emperor. Later, Dhian had the deposed Chand Kaur's servants changed, who then assassinated Chand in her palace by smashing her head with wooden pikes on 11 June 1842.

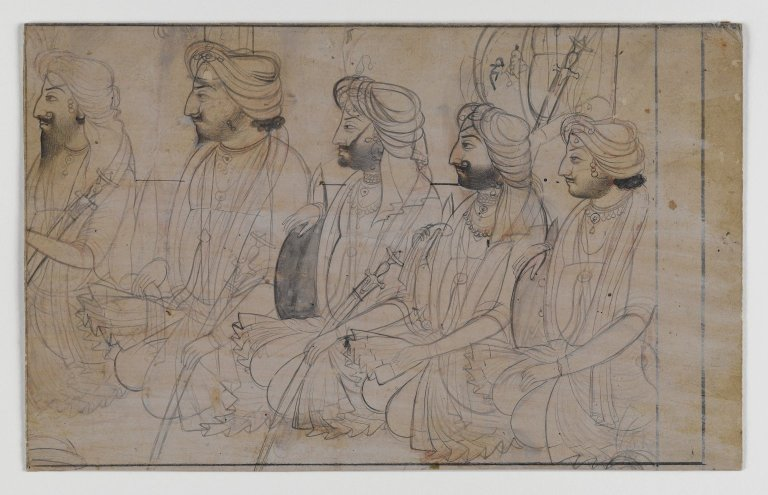
Portrait of Dhian Singh, Gulab Singh, Ranbir Sohan, and Udham Singh made early 19th century now at the Brooklyn Museum.

Dhian Singh and emperor Sher Singh were both assassinated on 15 September 1843, in a plot led by Ajit Singh Sandhawalia. Dhian was shot and his body cut into pieces. Dhian's son Hira Singh led a counter-coup the next day, and killed the assassins. On 17 September 1843, Hira Singh Dogra, aged 24, succeeded his father as the prime minister, with five year old infant Duleep Singh being crowned emperor.

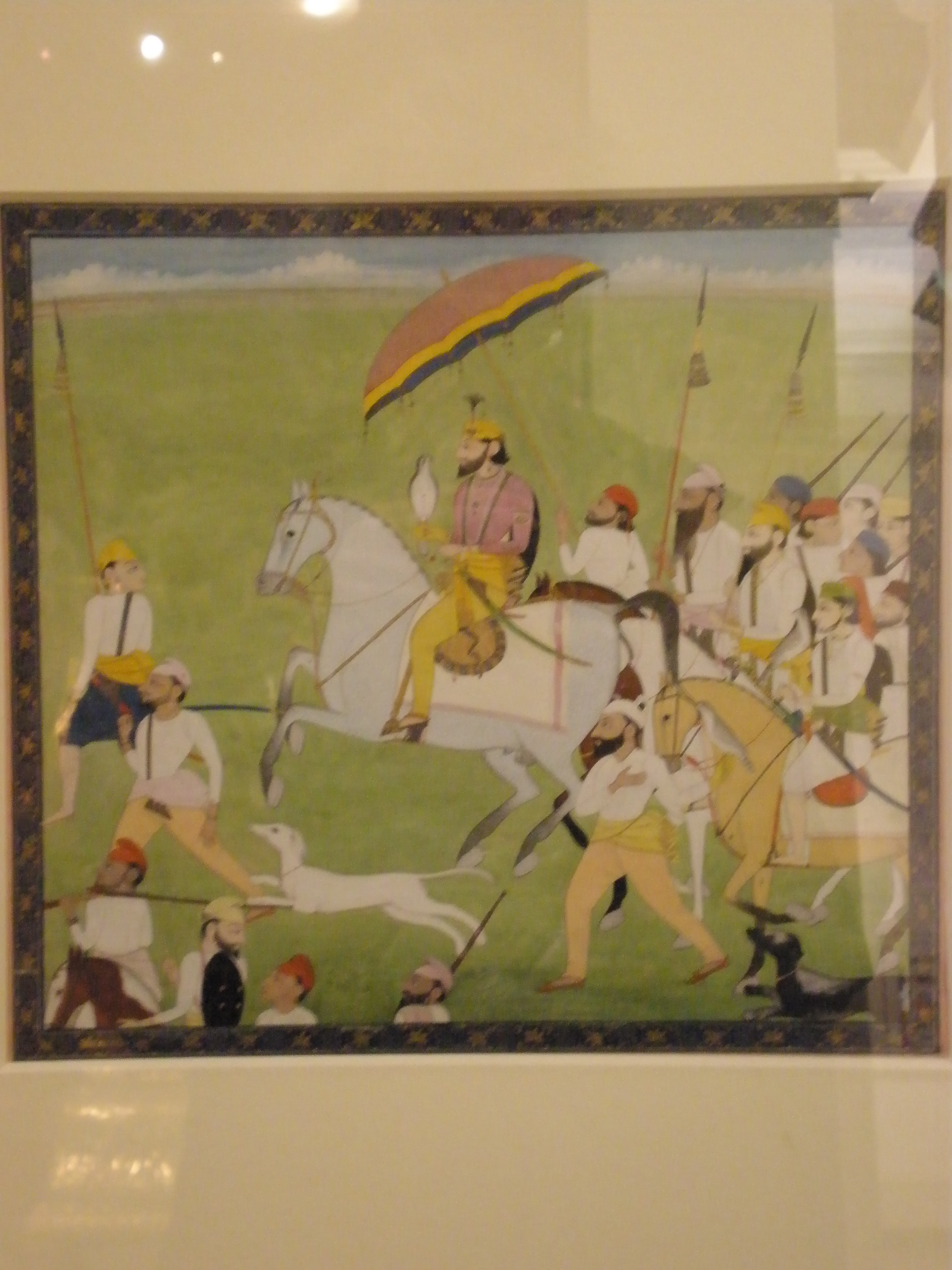
Raja Dhian Singh on a hawking expedition in watercolor on display at the Victoria & Albert Museum London. c. 1830

Dhian's younger brother Suchet Singh Dogra was killed on 27 March 1844, while leading a failed coup against Dhian's son Hira Singh Dogra. Hira himself was assassinated following another coup d'état led by Sham Singh Atariwala on 21 December 1844. A year later the First Anglo-Sikh War broke out on 11 December 1845.

Dhian's elder brother Maharajah Gulab Singh Dogra, was the prime minister of the Sikh empire from 31 January – 9 March 1846, during the First Anglo-Sikh War, and then became the first emperor of Jammu and Kashmir on 16 March 1846, by the Treaty of Amritsar. This followed the 9 March Treaty of Lahore and ultimately led up to the British East India Company gaining sovereignty over the Sikh empire.

Jagat Dev Singh a descendant of Gulab Singh's brother Dhian Singh a member of Poonch ruling family ascended the throne of Jammu and Kashmir from September 1925 to February 1926.
