= Karmo Kaur =

Sardarni of Nakai Misl (Died: 1806)

Sardarni Karam Kaur
- Sardarni of Nakai Misl; Regent of Nakai Misl

Regent of the Nakai Misl
- Tenure: c. 1784 – 1797
- Monarch: Bhagwan Singh; Gyan Singh
- Died: 1806; Baherwal Kalan, Nakai Misl, Sikh Empire (present-day Punjab, Pakistan)
- Spouse: Ran Singh Nakai
- Issue: Bhagwan Singh; Gyan Singh; Khazan Singh; Datar Kaur
- House: Nakai (by marriage)
- Religion: Sikhism

Sardarni Karam Kaur, popularly known as Karmo Kaur, was the wife of Ran Singh Nakai, the third ruler of the Nakai Misl, one of the groupings with its distinct guerilla militia that later became part of the Sikh Empire. Karmo Kaur served as the regent of the Nakai Misl during the reign of her sons, Bhagwan Singh and Gyan Singh. She was the mother of Maharani Datar Kaur, queen consort of Maharaja Ranjit Singh, the founder of the Sikh Empire. She was the grandmother of Maharaja Kharak Singh, the second king of the Sikh Empire and Sardar Kahan Singh Nakai, the last chief of the Nakai Misl.

== Early life ==
Karmo Kaur was married to Ran Singh Sandhu, son of Natha Singh Sandhu, around 1767 when he 17 years old. Sardar Heera Singh Sandhu was chief of the Nakai Misl at the time. Soon after his death in 1767 and her father-in-law's death in 1768, Nahar Singh Sandhu, elder brother of Ran Singh, succeeded Sardar Heera Singh as the Nakai chief. Heera Singh's son Dal Singh was still a suckling infant hence it was decided to pass the sardari to Natha Singh's son. Nahar Singh's reign did not last very long, he died just nine months after his succession, in a fight at Kot kamalia in 1769. After his death Ran Singh, became the next Sardar of the Misl. Upon her husband's accession, she became the sardarni of the Nakai Misl.

Ran Singh was a very ambitious man - his ambitious were matched by his courageous spirit. Under his leadership the Nakais rose to a very strong and important position in Punjab and acquired much territory under his rule. Ran Singh harbored ambitious to conquer Multan, but he was preoccupied by Wazir Singh's and kharal tribe's armed operations against him. Ran Singh died in battle against the Kharals in 1784. At the time of his death the Misl controlled Baharwal, Bucheki, Changa Manga, Chhichha, Chunian, Chunian, Dhaulri, Dipalpur, Faridabad, Fatahpur, Gugaira, Harappa, Jambar, Jethpur, Kanganpur, Khudian, Pakpattan, Raiwind, Chichawatni, Fatehabad, Killianwala, Kot Kamalia, Sahiwal, Syedwala, Sharakpur, Shergarh.

During the course of their marriage Sardar Ran Singh and Sardarni Karmo Kaur became parents to four children, 3 sons and a daughter.

- Sardar Bhagwan Singh Nakai (1770-1789), fourth chief of the Nakai Misl, succeeded his father
- Sardar Gyan Singh Nakai (1772-1807), succeeded his brother as the fifth chief of the Nakai Misl
- Sahib Khazan Singh Nakai (1778-1835), was granted a jagir at Nankot by his brother-in-law, Maharaja Ranjit Singh
- Bibi Raj Kaur Nakai (1784-1838), was the queen consort of the Sikh Empire.

== Regent ==
After the death of her husband, the Misl became week due to Wazir Singh's raging constant wars against Bhagwan Singh Nakai who had succeeded his father. Realizing he will soon lose all his territory he sought his mothers help. Sardarni Karmo Kaur took hold of the situation and arranged for a meeting with Wazir Singh. Accompanied by her three sons — Bhagwan Singh, Gian Singh and Khazan Singh, went Syedwala and got her villages released, in order to do that she had to accept allegiance to Wazir Singh. Discerned that Wazir Singh was still a danger, she sent Sardar Maha Singh, chief of the powerful Sukerchakia Misl a proposal to get her infant daughter, Raj Kaur betrothed to his four-year-old son, Ranjit Singh. This was the first alliance between Nakais and Sukherchakias, and it provided Sardarni Karmo and Sardar Bhagwan Singh with an ally that would help them counter Wazir Singh. Wazir Singh tried to break off this match, but was unable to do so. In an attempt to mislead her, Wazir Singh claimed that the Nakai Sandhu Jatts are superior to the Sukerchakias, but Sardarni Karmo Kaur refused to break off the match and stated as Sikhs we are all equal. Eventually Wazir Singh also befriended Maha Singh, the latter tried to reconcile the differences between Bhagwan Singh and Wazir Singh, but in vain. Later in 1785, Maha Singh was facing attacks from Sardar Jai Singh Kanhaiya of the Kanhaiya Misl and called on Bhagwan Singh and Wazir Singh to aid him. After their victory against the Kanhaiyas, Maha Singh began to favor Wazir Singh, which made Bhagwan Singh fell left out. Despite Maha Singh's efforts to bring peace, Bhagwan Singh and Wazir Singh continued to engage in constant warfare and in 1789 Bhagwan Singh was killed by Wazir Singh. Dal Singh, son of Heera Singh Sandhu avenged the death of Bhagwan Singh by killing Wazir Singh but was killed by a servant of Wazir Singh.

Her second son, Gyan Singh succeeded the elder son, Bhagwan Singh. She continued to guide Gyan Singh in the affairs of the state, and with the family's old enemy Wazir Singh being killed by Dal Singh, son of Heera Singh Sandhu, Gyan Singh had a relatively peaceful reign.

In 1797, Nakais assisted the then Sardar Ranjit Singh of the Sukerchakia Misl to expel the attempts of Shah Zaman to annex Punjab region into his control through his general Shahanchi Khan and 12,000 soldiers. In 1797, Ranjit Singh sought for Raj Kaur Nakain's hand in marriage as they have been betrothed for sometime now. Gyan Singh was reported not pleased as in 1796, Raj Kaur (Mai Malwain), the mother of Ranjit Singh had gotten him married to Mehtab Kaur, daughter of Sada Kaur and Gurbaksh Singh of the Kanhaiya Misl. Upon his mother's advice Gyan Singh agreed and Raj Kaur was married to Ranjit Singh who then renamed her 'Datar Kaur' as many ladies in the Sukerchakia Misl bore the name "Raj Kaur", like Ranjit Singh mother and his aunt (daughter of Sardar Charat Singh) Datar Kaur was affectionately called Mai Nakain by Ranjit Singh, though Ranjit Singh married several times for political reasons, Datar Kaur remained his favorite and most respected wife. Later that same year when Shah Zaman invaded Punjab again, the sardars united under Ranjit Singh and let his army enter Lahore only blocked off all food and supplies which lead to his army retreating. While they were busy fighting in Lahore, Muzaffar Khan, Shah's relative and governor of Multan province, took advantage of the situation and took Syedwala. In 1799, Nakais helped Ranjit Singh and Sada Kaur liberate Lahore from the Bhangi Sardars. On April 2, 1801, Ranjit Singh founded the Sarkar e Khalsa and proclaimed himself the "Maharaja of Punjab". Earlier that year in February, Datar Kaur had given birth to Ranjit Singh's first son and heir apparent, Kharak Singh and four years later she gave birth to another son, Rattan Singh. Datar Kaur took an active interest in the affairs of the State, and being the mother of Ranjit Singh's eldest sons- who became first and second in the line of succession to The throne of Punjab, she became his chief consort. In 1818, she given command during the Battle of Multan along with her son, Kharak Singh the then Sri Tikka Kanwar (Crown Prince) and together they conquered Multan.
