= Ran Singh Nakai =

Sikh Chief (1750–1784)

Chief of Nakai Misl
- Reign: 1768–1784
- Predecessor: Nahar Singh
- Successor: Bhagwan Singh
- Born: 1750; Multan, Sikh Confederacy (present-day Punjab, Pakistan)
- Died: 1784 (aged 33–34); Kot Kamalia, Nakai Misl, Sikh Confederacy (present-day Punjab, Pakistan)
- Spouse: Karmo Kaur
- Issue: Bhagwan Singh Nakai; Gyan Singh Nakai; Khazan Singh Nakai; Maharani Datar Kaur
- House: Nakai Misl
- Father: Natha Singh

Sardar Ran Singh Nakai (1750–1784) was the third chief of the Nakai Misl, one of the Sikh groupings and guerilla militia that later became part of the Sikh Empire. He was born to the Sandhu family of Jat Sikhs. He was in campaigns with his father, Natha Singh Sandhu and uncle, Heera Singh Sandhu who was the founder of the Misl. He was the father of Maharani Datar Kaur and the father-in-law of Maharaja Ranjit Singh, the founder of the Sikh Empire. He was the grandfather of Maharaja Kharak Singh, the second king of the Sikh Empire and Sardar Kahan Singh Nakai, the last chief of the Nakai Misl.

== Family history ==
Ran Singh Sandhu was born into the family of the ruling Nakai Sardars. His father was Natha Singh Sandhu (d. 1768), nephew of the legendary Heera Singh Sandhu (1706-1767), founder of the principality of Nakai Misl in 1748. He had an older brother, Nahar Singh who briefly became the ruler of the Nakai Misl and a younger brother named Gurbaksh Singh.

According to a legend in 1595, Guru Arjan Dev (1563–1606), the Fifth Sikh Guru, with some of his followers visited the village of Baherwal. However, the Guru was not received with hospitality and he passed on to the neighbouring village of Jambar where he lay down on a charpai (cot) under a shady tree. When Chaudhary Hemraj, Sandhu Jat, who was absent when the Guru passed through his village, heard of what had happened rushed to Jambar and brought the Guru to his town and apologized for the inhospitality. The Guru blessed him and prophesied that one day his kin would rule. In 1733, Heera Singh became the first in his family to take Amrit Sanskar. In 1748, Heera Singh took possession of the lands surrounding his native village, Baherwal and countryside of Kasur which was located in the Nakka country South of Majha Region and his misl took the name of that area. Nakka in Punjabi means border or some sort of a gateway and the Nakka country was located between the Ravi and Sutlej south of Lahore. I n the following years he conquered Chunian from the Afghans but died near Pakpattan in a battle against Sujan Chisti- a devotee of the Shrine of Baba Farid.

== Succession ==
Ran Singh's elder brother Nahar Singh succeeded their uncle, Heera Singh as the second ruler of the Nakai Misl as Heera Singh's son Dal was still an infant. Nahar Singh's reign did not last very long. He died just nine months after his succession, in a fight at Kot Kamalia in 1768. After his death Ran Singh, became the next Sardar of the Misl.

== Leadership of the Nakai Misl ==
Sardar Ran Singh was the most powerful of all the Nakai chiefs and under his leadership the Nakais rose to a very strong and important position in Punjab. He was very ambitious and started acquiring territory under his Misl, he held Chunian, parts of Kasur, Sharakpur, Gogaira pargana and Kot Kamalia— by defeating the Kharral tribe. Sometime later Dal Singh was married to the daughter of Sardar Kamar Singh, who wanted to remove Ran Singh and appoint Dal Singh as the Nakai chief. His ambitious led to hostility between Kamar Singh and Ran Singh, while the young Dal Singh was a mere spectator in the intrigues. Kamar Singh was the chief of Syedwala, Satghara and Kot Kamalia and had four hundred horsemen at his command, and he fearing Ran Singh eyeing his territory. Kamar Singh summoned Ganga Singh Gill of Bujaki and Baga Sudha and Lal Singh of Jamsher Bandu and decided to combine their military resources against Ran Singh. Despite all their efforts the Ran Singh was victorious due to his military prowess and aid he received from Sardar Amir Singh, leader of Janan community who were subjected to the unfair taxes of Kamar Singh. He continued to exceeded his rule to the taluqas of Bucheke, Chhanga Manga, 69 km from Lahore, Chhichha, Devsal, Fatahpur, Jethupur, Kasur, Kharral fort of Kot Kamalia, Sharakpur, Gugera pargana, 5 km to the west of the Ravi, and Shergarh. In 1781, Amir Singh killed Kamar Singh and Ran Singh conquered Syedwala. Kamar Singh's estates were inherited by his son-in-law, Dal Singh and brother-in-law, Wazir Singh. Wazir Singh swore revenge against Amir Singh and Ran Singh; and in 1782 he killed Amir Singh in battle. Ran Singh harbored ambitious to conquer Multan, but he was preoccupied by Wazir Singh's armed operations against him. Sardar Ran Singh Nakai was killed by one of the kharal tribe men peroka kharal. The year of his death is disputed while Bhagata Singha and Hari Ram Gupta sum it to be c. 1781, Khazan Singh mentions it as Sambat 1839 which is c. 1784 AD It is probably the latter as his daughter was in her twelfth or thirteenth year when she was married to Ranjit Singh, which means she was born in 1784. At the time of his death the Misl controlled Baharwal, Bucheki, Changa Manga, Chhichha, Chunian, Chunian, Dhaulri, Dipalpur, Faridabad, Fatahpur, Gugaira, Harappa, Jambar, Jethpur, Kanganpur, Khudian, Pakpattan, Raiwind, Chichawatni, Fatehabad, Killianwala, Kot Kamalia, Sahiwal, Syedwala, Sharakpur, Shergarh.

== Issue ==
Sardar Ran Singh Nakai was married to Bibi Karmo Kaur and had three sons and one daughter.

- Sardar Bhagwan Singh Nakai (d. 1789), fourth chief of the Nakai Misl, succeeded his father
- Sardar Gyan Singh Nakai (d. 1807), succeeded his brother as the fifth chief of the Nakai Misl
- Sahib Khazan Singh Nakai (d. 1835), was granted a jagir at Nankot by his brother-in-law, Maharaja Ranjit Singh
- Bibi Raj Kaur Nakai (d. 1838), was the queen consort of the Sikh Empire.
- Another daughter elder to Raj Kaur

Bhagwan Singh Nakai succeeded his father, but the young chief was unable to hold most of his territories against Wazir Singh. Sardarni Karmo with her three sons— Bhagwan Singh, Gian Singh and Khazan Singh, came to a garden in Syedwala and accepted allegiance to Wazir Singh and got her villages released. Realizing they might lose all their territories to Wazir Singh, Sardarni Karmo Kaur had her son, Bhagwan Singh approach Sardar Maha Singh of the powerful Sukerchakia Misl to get her infant daughter, Raj Kaur Nakai betrothed to his the four-year-old son, Ranjit Singh; in order to gain a power ally. Maha Singh accepted the alliance, this was the first political alliance between the Sukerchakis and the Nakais. Wazir Singh tried to break off this match, but was unable to do so and decided to befriend Maha Singh as well. Later in 1785, Maha Singh was facing attacks from Sardar Jai Singh Kanhaiya of the Kanhaiya Misl and called on Bhagwan Singh and Wazir Singh to aid him. After their victory against the Kanhaiyas, Maha Singh began to favor Wazir Singh, which made Bhagwan Singh feel left out. Maha Singh tried to reconcile the differences between Bhagwan Singh and Wazir Singh, but they continued to engage in constant warfare and in 1789 he was killed by Wazir Singh. Dal Singh, son of Heera Singh Sandhu, avenged the death of Bhagwan Singh by killing Wazir Singh, but was later killed by a servant of Wazir Singh.

Gyan Singh Nakai succeeded by his brother, Bhagwan Singh as the head of the Nakai Misl in 1789 since his brother had no children. Gyan Singh had a relatively peaceful reign and was able to consolidate his power. In 1798, Ranjit Singh sought for Raj Kaur Nakai's hand in marriage- as they were betrothed for quite some time. He wanted to unite the Sikh Misls and consolidate his position as the head of the Sukerchakia Misl, as well as to strengthen the Nakai and Sukerchakia relations. Gyan Singh agreed and the couple were married. In that year Shah Zaman of Kabul invaded Panjab and stayed at Lahore for a period. The Shah's relative, Muzaffar Khan, governor of Multan province, took advantage of Shah's presence in the Panjab and took over Syedwala.

Khazan Singh Nakai was the third and the youngest son of Sardar Ran Singh Nakai and Sardarni Karmo Kaur. He assisted his nephew Kahan Singh, who succeed his father, Gyan Singh as the sixth chief of the Nakai Misl in 1807. After Ranjit Singh had declared himself the Maharaja of Punjab in 1801 he had kept consolidating majority of the Misls. The ambitious Maharaja had been eyeing the Nakai territory, but had spared it till the death of Sardar Gyan Singh in 1807. But soon after suggested Sardar Kahan Singh wto join the Lahore Darbar, which the proud Nakai chief steadily refused to obligate. Finally, in 1811, Ranjit Singh sent Kharak Singh to annex all the Nakai territories; Sardar Kahan Singh came back from a campaign in Multan to find his cousin, Kharak Singh has taken over his misl. Diwan Hakim Rai, the administer of the Nakai Chief, immediately approached Ranjit Singh with the request that it was not proper for the Lahore forces to take military action against his nephew's misl. Sohan Lai Suri notes that the Maharaja, very politely, said "I have nothing to do in this matter, Kunwar Kharak Singh is the maternal grandson of the Nakais and only he knows as to what is to be done." Before having his estates seized Kahan Singh was successful in conquering Pakpattan. Ranjit Singh granted Kahan Singh jagir at Baherwal while his brother-in-law, Khazan Singh was granted a jagir at Nankot. The Nakais continued to live in Baharwal and the Nakais remained loyal to Maharaja Ranjit Singh. Khazan Singh was succeeded by his only son Panju Singh.

Bibi Raj Kaur Nakai was the youngest daughter of Sardar Ran Singh Nakai and his wife Sardarni Karmo Kaur. In 1797, she was married to the then Sardar Ranjit Singh of Gujranwala As many ladies in the Sukerchakia Misl bore the name "Raj Kaur", like Ranjit Singh mother and his aunt (daughter of Sardar Charat Singh), she was renamed Datar Kaur. Ranjit Singh lovingly addressed her as Mai Nakain, she remained his favorite and most respected wife all his life. It was his second marriage, with the first being to Mehtab Kaur of the Kanhaiya Misl. In 1801, Ranjit Singh founded the Sikh Empire and was proclaimed the "Maharaja of Punjab.", after liberating Lahore in 1799. Earlier the same year she gave birth to his first son and heir apparent, Kharak Singh. It was his birth that persuaded his father to proclaim himself the Maharaja. In 1805, she gave birth to another son, Rattan Singh. She was exceptionally intelligent and assisted him in affairs of State, and bore him his elder sons, hence becoming his queen consort. She led the Sikh Khalsa Army during the Battle of Multan (1818).

His grandchildren include: Bibi Ratan Kaur, Bibi Daya Kaur and Sardar Kahan Singh Nakai the children of Sardar Gyan Singh; Panju Singh the only son of Khazan Singh; Maharaja Kharak Singh, Kunwar Rattan Singh, and Kunwar Fateh Singh the sons of Datar Kaur and Maharaja Ranjit Singh.
