= Rattan Singh =

Sikh prince

Rattan Singh Gadwai
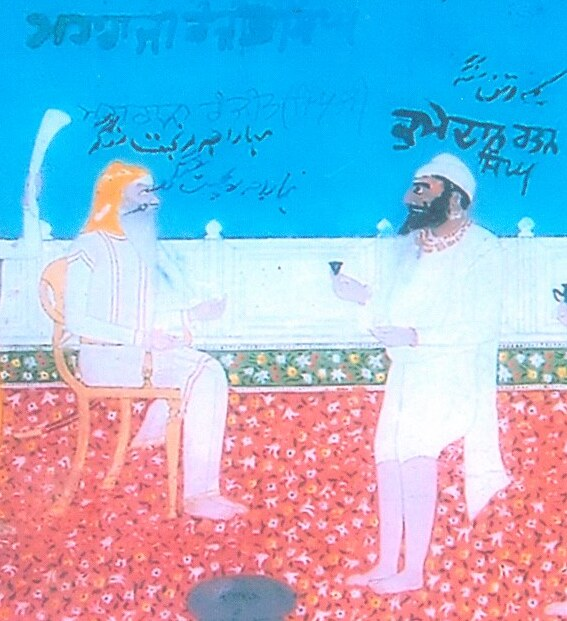
- Painting of Maharaja Ranjit Singh (left) with Rattan Singh (right)
- Born: 1805; Lahore, Punjab, Sikh Empire
- Died: 1845 (aged 39–40); Amritsar, Punjab, Sikh Empire
- Spouse: Raj Devi; Bhagbhari Kanwar
- Issue: Gurdit Singh; Thakur Singh; Bhagwan Singh

Rattan Singh Gadwai (1805–1845) was an official who served Maharaja Ranjit Singh of the Sikh Empire. There are claims that he was a son of Maharaja Ranjit Singh and Datar Kaur, however this claim is in-dispute, as Rattan Singh belonged to a different caste from Ranjit Singh and evidence suggests he served as a non-biologically-related official in his court, not as a son.

== Claim as Ranjit Singh's son ==
It is claimed that he was the second son of Maharaja Ranjit Singh, the founder of the Sikh Empire and his queen consort, Maharani Datar Kaur His elder brother, Maharaja Kharak Singh was the second Maharaja of the Sikh Empire and nephew, Maharaja Nau Nihal Singh was the third Maharaja. The former reigned for less than four months, and the latter barely four weeks.

He was the grandson of Sardar Maha Singh, second chief of the Sukerchakia Misl and Rajmata Raj Kaur. Sardar Ran Singh, third chief of the Nakai Misl and Sardarni Karmo Kaur were his maternal grandparents. His cousin Kahan Singh Nakai was the last Nakai chief.

It is widely known that Datar Kaur gave birth to a son, Kharak Singh who is known as the only son of Ranjit Singh and Datar Kaur. But, according to the documents such as Sajra Nasbe and Kursinama (pedigree table), as well as a painting of Ranjit Singh with Rattan Singh affirm that Datar Kaur and Ranjit Singh had another son named Rattan Singh born in 1805.

Rattan Singh was born to Maharaja Ranjit Singh and his second wife and queen consort, Maharani Datar Kaur, the daughter of Ran Singh Nakai the third ruler of the Nakai Misl. He was the younger brother of Kharak Singh who succeeded their father as the second Maharaja of the Sikh Empire.

He was married to Raj Devi and Bhagbhari Kanwar and had three sons, Gurdit Singh, Thakur Singh and Bhagwan Singh. He served under Hari Singh Nalwa and his elder brother, Kharak Singh during the Battle of Shopian in 1819. He was granted the Jagatpur Bajaj estate as his jagir.

During the reign of Maharaja Sher Singh a large part of his jagir was confiscated by Raja Hira Singh Dogra, who did the same with his half brothers, Kashmira Singh and Pashaura Singh.

He died during battle in 1845.

== Descendants ==
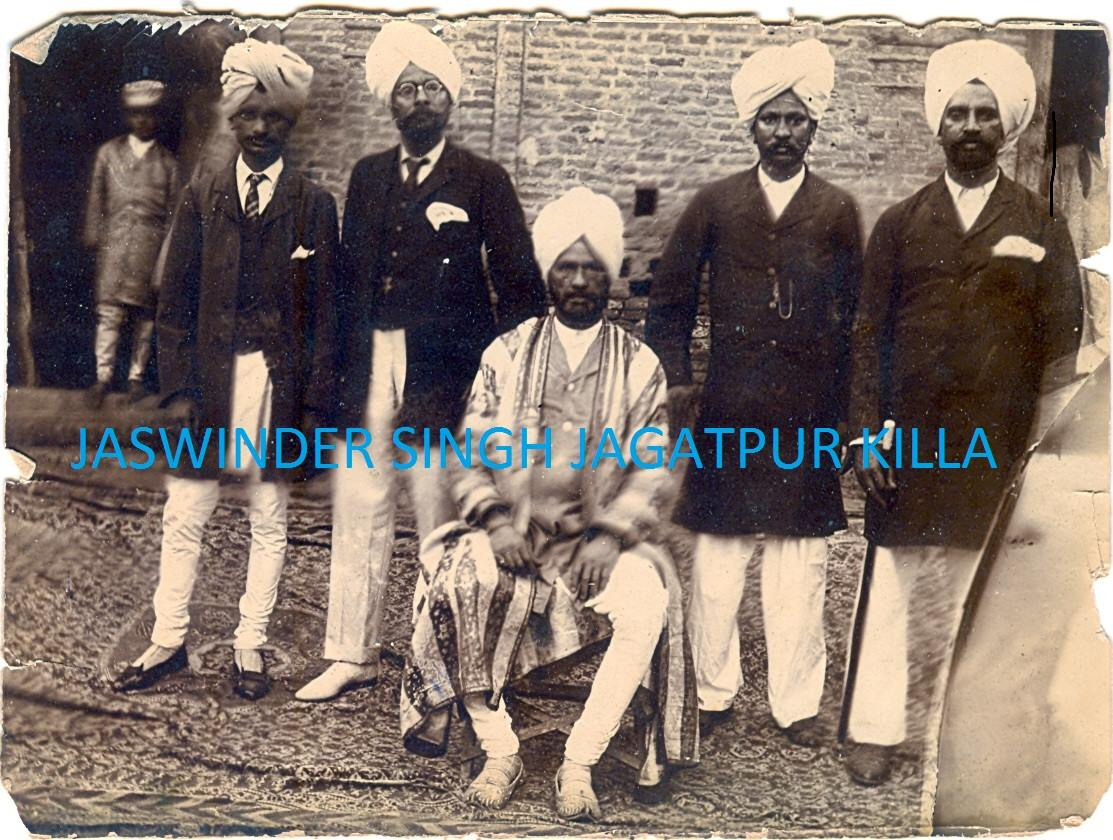
Photograph of Sardar Thakur Singh, commandant of Jagatpur Sikha

In 2020 Sandeep Singh Sukerchakia, his descendant, wrote a detailed letter to Narendra Modi, the Prime Minister of India insisting the inclusion of Punjabi Language in the New Jammu and Kashmir official Language Bill of 2020. In 2021, he appealed to Imran Khan, the Prime Minister of Pakistan to have a thorough probe into the incident of vandalism of the statue of Maharaja Ranjit Singh.

== See also ==
- Misl
- Maharaja Ranjit Singh
- Maharani Datar Kaur
- Sikh Empire
- Maharaja Kharak Singh
