= Beharwal Kalan =

- Town
- Location within Pakistan
- Coordinates: 30°56′56″N 73°44′36″E
- Country: Pakistan
- Province: Punjab
- District: Kasur
- Time zone: UTC+5 (PST)

Baharwal Kalan (Urdu: بہڑوال كلاں), is a village in the Union Council of Kasur District in the Punjab province of Pakistan. It is part of Pattoki Tehsil. The name is also spelled as Baherwal Kalan and was the seat of power of Nakai Misl.

== See also ==
1. Baherwal Kalan.

2. Nakai Misl.

3. Misl Nakai.

4. Sardar Muhammad Arif Nakai.

5. Datar Kaur.
