= Chunian Tehsil =

Chunian Tehsil تحصِيل چُونياں
- Tehsil
- Interactive map of Chunian Tehsil
- Country: Pakistan
- Province: (Punjab, Pakistan) Punjab
- District: Kasur
- Capital: Chunian
- Towns: 1
- Union councils: 27

Population (2017)
  - Tehsil: 825,684
  - Urban: 162,795
  - Rural: 662,889
- Time zone: UTC+5 (PST)
  - Summer (DST): UTC+6 (PDT)

Chunian (Punjabi, Urdu: تحصِيل چُونياں) is an administrative subdivision (tehsil) of Kasur District in the Punjab province of Pakistan. The city of Chunian is the headquarters of the tehsil.

== Administration ==
The tehsil of Chunian is administratively subdivided into 27 Union Councils, these are:

- Bhagiwal
- Changa Manga
- Chak No 13
- Chak No 18
- Chunian-1
- Chunian-2
- Deo Sial
- Dhuttay
- Gehlan Hithar
- Jaguwala
- Jajjal
- Jamsher alan
- Jamsher Khurd
- Jand Wala
- Kanganpur
- Kanganpur (Rural)
- Allahabad
- Gillan Wala
- Kotha
- Kull
- Lunday
- Maujoki
- Mokal
- Mulapur
- Mundayki
- Sadda
- Talwandi
- Wan Khara
- Umme Pur

== See also ==
- Chunian
- Changa Manga
- Kasur District
