= Kahan Singh Nakai =

Sikh Chief (died: 1873)

Chief of Nakai Misl
- Reign: 1807-1811
- Predecessor: Gyan Singh
- Successor: Misl merged into Sikh Empire; Chatar Singh (as Head of the Nakai Misl)
- Born: Baherwal Kalan, Nakai Misl, Sikh Confederacy
- Died: 1873; Baherwal Kalan, Kasur, British India
- Issue: Hukum Singh; Chatar Singh; Attar Singh; Ishar singh
- House: Nakai
- Father: Gyan Singh
- Mother: Rai Kaur

Sardar Kahan Singh Nakai (died 1873) was the sixth and last chief of the Nakai Misl. He was the grandson of the famous Sikh chief, Ran Singh Nakai and Sardarni Karmo Kaur. His aunt, Maharani Datar Kaur was one of the wives of Maharaja Ranjit Singh, founder of the Sikh Empire. From an early age he assisted his father in campaigns and even commanded campaigns assigned to him by his uncle, Maharaja Ranjit Singh. His cousin, Kharak Singh went on to become the second Maharaja of the Sikh Empire, though he ruled for barely four months. He was the uncle of the third Maharaja, Nau Nihal Singh.

== Family history and early life ==
Kahan Singh was born to Sardar Gyan Singh Nakai, the ruling chief of the Nakai Misl. His grandfather, Ran Singh Nakai was the most powerful ruler of the Nakai Misl, a fierce warrior and under his leadership the misl was at its highest. He was an ambitious man and had exceeded his rule to the taluqas of Bucheke, Changa Manga, 69 km from Lahore, Chhichha, Devsal, Fatahpur, Jethpur, Kasur, Kharral fort of Kot kamalia, Sharakpur, Gugera pargana, 5 km to the west of the Ravi, and Shergarh. He had fought repeatedly against Kamar Singh, the ruler of Syedwala. Sometime before his death, he defeated him and captured Syedwala.

Ran Singh was succeeded by his eldest son Bhagwan Singh, who was unable to hold his territory against the ambitious Wazir Singh. In 1785, Sardar Maha Singh of Sukerchakia Misl was facing attacks from Sardar Jai Singh Kanhaiya of the Kanhaiya Misl and called on Bhagwan Singh and Wazir Singh to aid him. Bhagwan Singh who had previous faced attacks from Jai Singh willingly aided Maha Singh. Despite Maha Singh trying to reconcile the differences between Wazir Singh and Bhagwan Singh, but in vain and in 1789 the latter was slain. Bhagwan Singh was succeeded by his brother, Gyan Singh who had a relatively peaceful reign. With his father as the chief, Kahan Singh became the heir apparent of the Nakai Misldar. He had an older sister, Bibi Rattan Kaur who was married to Sardar Ram Singh Taragarhia and younger sister, Bibi Daya Kaur who married Sardar Amar Singh Veglia.

In 1797, Nakais assisted the then Sardar Ranjit Singh of the Sukerchakia Misl who had been betrothed to his aunt, Bibi Raj Kaur by Bhagwan and Singh in the mid 1780s to expel the attempts of Shah Zaman to annex Punjab region into his control through his general Shahanchi Khan and 12,000 soldiers. Next year his aunt, Raj Kaur was married to Ranjit Singh who then renamed her 'Datar Kaur' as many ladies in the Sukerchakia Misl bore the name "Raj Kaur", like Ranjit Singh mother and his aunt (daughter of Sardar Charat Singh). Later that same year when Shah Zaman invaded Punjab again, the sardars united under Ranjit Singh and let his army enter Lahore only blocked off all food and supplies which lead to his army retreating. While they were busy fighting in Lahore, Muzaffar Khan, Shah's relative and governor of Multan province, took advantage of the situation and took Syedwala. In 1799, his father sent him along with his uncle, Khazan Singh to aid Ranjit Singh liberate Lahore from the Bhangi Sardars. In 1801 after Datar Kaur gave birth to Ranjit Singh's first son and heir apparent, Kharak Singh, he proclaimed himself the "Maharaja of Punjab".

Kahan Singh would often aid his cousin, Kharak Singh in campaigns.

== Chief of the Nakai Misl ==
After his father's death in 1807, he was assisted by his uncle, Khazan Singh in affair of the states. One of the first tasks he did was to re-conquer Pakpattan.

After Ranjit Singh had declared himself the Maharaja of Punjab in 1801 he had kept consolidating majority of the Misls. The ambitious Maharaja had been eyeing the Nakai territory, but had spared it till the death of Sardar Gyan Singh in 1807. But soon after suggested Sardar Kahan Singh, who succeeded his father as the sixth chief of the Nakais to join the Lahore Darbar, which the proud newly crowned Nakai chief steadily refused to obligate. The Nakai territory situated between Multan and Kasur and not wanting to lose territory to the Afghan Nawab Muzaffar Khan, Ranjit Singh was adamant on acquiring the Nakai territory.

Despite being the Sardar of the Nakais, Sardar Kahn Singh carried out tasks given to him by his uncle, Ranjit Singh. In 1811, he was sent to Multan to obtain tribute(taxes) from Muzaffar Khan on behalf of the Lahore Durbar. Meanwhile, Ranjit Singh sent Kharak Singh, then the Crown Prince, to annex all the Nakai territories; Sardar Kahan Singh came back from Multan to find Kharak Singh has taken over his misl. Diwan Hakim Rai, the administer of the Nakai Chief, immediately approached Ranjit Singh with the request that it was not proper for the Lahore forces to take military action against his nephew's misl. Sohan Lai Suri notes that the Maharaja, very politely, said

"I have nothing to do in this matter, Kunwar Kharak Singh is the maternal grandson of the Nakais and only he knows as to what is to be done."

Sardar Kahan Singh didn't protest and power was successfully transited to Kharak Singh.

== Life after annexation ==
Ranjit Singh granted Kahan Singh jagir at Baherwal which yielded twenty thousand rupees annually. Khazan Singh was also given a jagir at Nawankot which was situated in Doaba Rachna, adjoining Sharakpur, his jagir yielded an annual income of twelve thousand rupees. Sardar Kahan Singh continued to live in Baharwal and the Nakais remained loyal to Maharaja Ranjit Singh and later to Maharaja Kharak Singh.

In 1846, his army commander by his son Attar Singh joined the rebellion in Multan against the British. Sardar Kahan Singh was later appointed Jagirdar Magistrate in 1860, an office he held till his death.
