= Heera Singh Sandhu =

Founder of the Nakai Misl
- Reign: 1748-1767
- Successor: Nar Singh Nakai
- Born: 1706; Baherwal Kalan, Punjab, Mughal Empire
- Died: 1767 (aged 60–61); Pakpattan, Sikh Confederacy
- Issue: Dal Singh Nakai
- House: Nakai
- Father: Chaudhry Sandhu

Sardar Heera Singh Sandhu (1706–1767) was the founder of Nakai Misl, one of the twelve Sikh Misls that later became the Sikh Empire under the leadership of Ranjit Singh. Heera Singh was born in a Sandhu Jat Sikh family in present-day Pakistan. He was killed in battle near Pakpattan when he partook in a battle against a Chisti Army of devotees of Baba Farid's shrine in 1767.

== Life ==
Heera Singh Sandhu was born into a Jat Sikh family in 1706 in the Punjab region in what is now Pakistan. He took possession of the lands surrounding his native village, Baherwal Kalan and countryside of Kasur which was located in the Nakka country South of Majha region. He took Amrit Sanchar (Sikh Baptism) in 1731. Nakka in Punjabi means border or some sort of a gateway and the Nakka country was located between the Ravi and Sutlej south of Lahore. He also took Chunian from the Afghans but died in a battle against Sujan Chisti for Pakpattan. His companions brought his dead body to Baherwal where it was cremated. Heera Singh Sandhu's son, Dal Singh Sandhu, was a minor, so his nephew, Nar Singh Sandhu son of Heera Singh Sandhu's brother Natha Singh Sandhu, succeeded him as leader of the misl. Natha Singh is the father of Sardar Ran Singh Nakai and grandfather of Maharani Datar Kaur, one of the wives of Maharaja Ranjit Singh and mother of Maharaja Kharak Singh.
