= Deo Sial =

- Village
- Deo Sial
- Location within Pakistan
- Coordinates: 30°52′40″N 73°50′57″E
- Country: Pakistan
- Province: Punjab
- Elevation: 171 m (561 ft)

Population
  - Total: 15,458
- Time zone: UTC+5 (PST)

Deo Sial (Dew Sial) is a town and Union Council of Chunian in the Punjab province of Pakistan. It is part of Chunian Tehsil and is located at an altitude of 171 metres (564 feet) above sea level. Deo Sial Union Council 74 elected local government of town.

== History ==
Deo Sial was founded before 1947. It is the 15rd biggest village of District Kasur by area after Harchoki and Jumber.

== Education ==
Schools:

- Government Elementary School For Boys
- Government High School For Boys Hussain Khan Wala Ch 8
- Government High School For Girls Hussain Khan Wala Ch 8
- Aysha Model High School For Girls (Private) Hussain Khan Wala Ch 8
- Asad Model High School (Private) Hussain Khan Wala Ch 8
- Government Primary School For Girls School
- Shah-e-Najhaf Model Elementary School
- Sharfa Modal School Kot Chudrya Wala
- Ayaan Educational Complex
- (BHU) Hospital Hussain Khan Wala Ch 8
- Government Hospital Deo Sial
