= Mokal =

Mokal is a sub clan of Sandhu Jat found mainly in central Punjab (region). There is also a village named as Mokal in Kasur District in the Punjab province of Pakistan. It is part of Chunian Tehsil and is located at 30°46'60N 74°12'0E with an altitude of 178 metres (587 feet).

Mokal is also a caste name within the Agri community of Maharashtra.
