= Jethpur =

- Village
- Location in Punjab, India Jethpur (India)
- Coordinates: 31.3618183°N 75.749343°E
- Country: India
- State: Punjab
- District: Jalandhar

Government
  - Type: Panchayat raj
  - Body: Gram panchayat
- Elevation: 240 m (790 ft)

Languages
  - Official: Punjabi
- Time zone: UTC+5:30 (IST)
- ISO 3166 code: IN-PB
- Vehicle registration: PB- 08
- Website: jalandhar.nic.in

Jethpur is a village in Jalandhar district of Punjab State, India. It is located 25 kilometres (16 mi) from district headquarter Jalandhar and 144 kilometres (89 mi) from state capital Chandigarh. The village is administrated by a sarpanch who is an elected representative of village as per Panchayati raj (India).

The villages of Chak Jethpur, Mussapur, Lutera Khurd, Lutera Kalan, Kotli Jamiat Singh are located nearby.

== See also ==
- List of villages in India
