= Gohar, Pakistan =

Gohar
- Location within Pakistan
- Coordinates: 32.28°N 73.19°E
- Country: Pakistan
- Province: Punjab
- Elevation: 206 m (676 ft)
- Time zone: UTC+5 (PST)

Gohar, also known as Chak 8, is a village of Pattoki Tehsil, Kasur District in the Punjab province of Pakistan.

== Geography ==
It is located at 32°28'0N 73°19'0E with an altitude of 206 metres (679 feet). It is close to Gehlan.

== Notable residents ==
Gohar is famous for two Islamic scholars, namely, Maulana Ishaq Rehmani and Maulana Mohi ud din Salfi. Molanah Ishaq Rehmani was a member of the Gen Ayub Advisory Council. Monalh Mohi ud din salfi served in Medina University in Saudi Arabia. There is also an Islamic Scholar Prof. Hafiz Muhammad Ayub, a prominent Religious Scholar and was Head of Islamic Studies Department UET Lahore also belongs from notable family of Gohar.
