= Khem Kaur Dhillon =

Sikh prince

- Maharani of Sikh Empire
- Born: 1805; Gujranwala, Sikh Empire
- Died: 1881; Amritsar, British India
- Spouse: Kharak Singh (m. 1815; died 1840)
- House: Sukerchakia (by marriage)
- Father: Jodh Singh Dhillon Kalalwala

Khem Kaur Dhillon (Gurmukhi: ਖੇਮ ਕੌਰ ਢਿੱਲੋਂ) was a Sikh queen and the second wife of Maharaja Kharak Singh, the second Maharaja of the Sikh Empire.

== Biography ==
She was the daughter of Jodh Singh and granddaughter of Sahib Singh Dhillon. In July 1815 she was married to Kharak Singh, the oldest son of Maharaja Ranjit Singh, the founder of the Sikh Empire and his queen consort, Maharani Datar Kaur.

Also with her brother, Gurdit Singh and Chanda Singh she aided the Khalsa Army in the Second Anglo-Sikh War on 1848.

Due to her role in the Second Anglo-Sikh War in 1849, her Jagirs (land) were considerably reduced; as the British deemed her anti-British.
