= Kotha, Punjab =

Kotha
- Town
- Location within Pakistan
- Coordinates: 30°56′56″N 73°44′36″E
- Country: Pakistan
- Province: Punjab
- District: Kasur
- Time zone: UTC+5 (PST)

Kotha is a town and Union Council of Kasur District in the Punjab province of Pakistan. It is part of Chunian Tehsil, and is located at 30°49'0N 74°10'0E with an altitude of 178 metres (587 feet).
