= Talwandi =

- Town
- Interactive map of Talwandi
- Coordinates: 30°56′56″N 73°44′36″E
- Country: Pakistan
- Province: Punjab
- District: Kasur

Population
  - Total: nearly 30,000
- Time zone: UTC+5 (PST)

Talwandi or Talvandi (Urdu: تلونڈى), is a town and Union Council of Kasur District in the Punjab province of Pakistan. It is a union council of Chunian Tehsil located at 30°53'60N 74°7'60E and has an altitude of 175 metres (577 feet).
