= Bhagiwal =

- Town
- Location within Pakistan
- Coordinates: 30°56′56″N 73°44′36″E
- Country: Pakistan
- Province: Punjab
- District: Kasur
- Time zone: UTC+5 (PST)

Bhagiwal is a town and Union Council of Kasur District in the Punjab province of Pakistan. It is part of Chunian Tehsil and is located at an altitude of 173 metres (570 feet).

There are several towns known as 'Bhagiwal' in Tibba, Lanwanwala, Mehrey Wala, and others.
