= Jamsher Khurd =

Jamsher Khurd جمشیر خُورد
- Town
- Location within Pakistan
- Coordinates: 30°56′56″N 73°44′36″E
- Country: Pakistan
- Province: Punjab
- District: Kasur
- Time zone: UTC+5 (PST)

Jamsher Khurd (Urdu: جمشير خُورد) is a town and Union Council of Kasur District in the Punjab province of Pakistan. It is part of Chunian Tehsil and is located at 30°55'35N 74°4'10E with an altitude of 172 metres (567 feet). Khurd and Kalan are Persian language words which mean small and big respectively. When two villages have the same name then they are distinguished by adding Kalan (big) and Khurd (small) at the end of the village name, based on their size relative to each other.

== Rural Dispensary Jamsher Khurd ==
The Rural Dispensary (RD) Jamsher Khurd is being run under the administration of Dr. Mian Afnan Sharif by Punjab Rural Support Program (PRSP) Kasur. An average of 1500 patients are being treated every month.
