= Datar Kaur =

Maharani Sri Datar Kaur Mai Nakain Sahiba of Sarkar-i-Khalsa (1784-1838)

- Maharani Sri Datar Kaur Mai Nakain Sahiba of Sarkar-i-Khalsa; Maharani of Punjab; Maharani of Lahore; Maharani of Kashmir
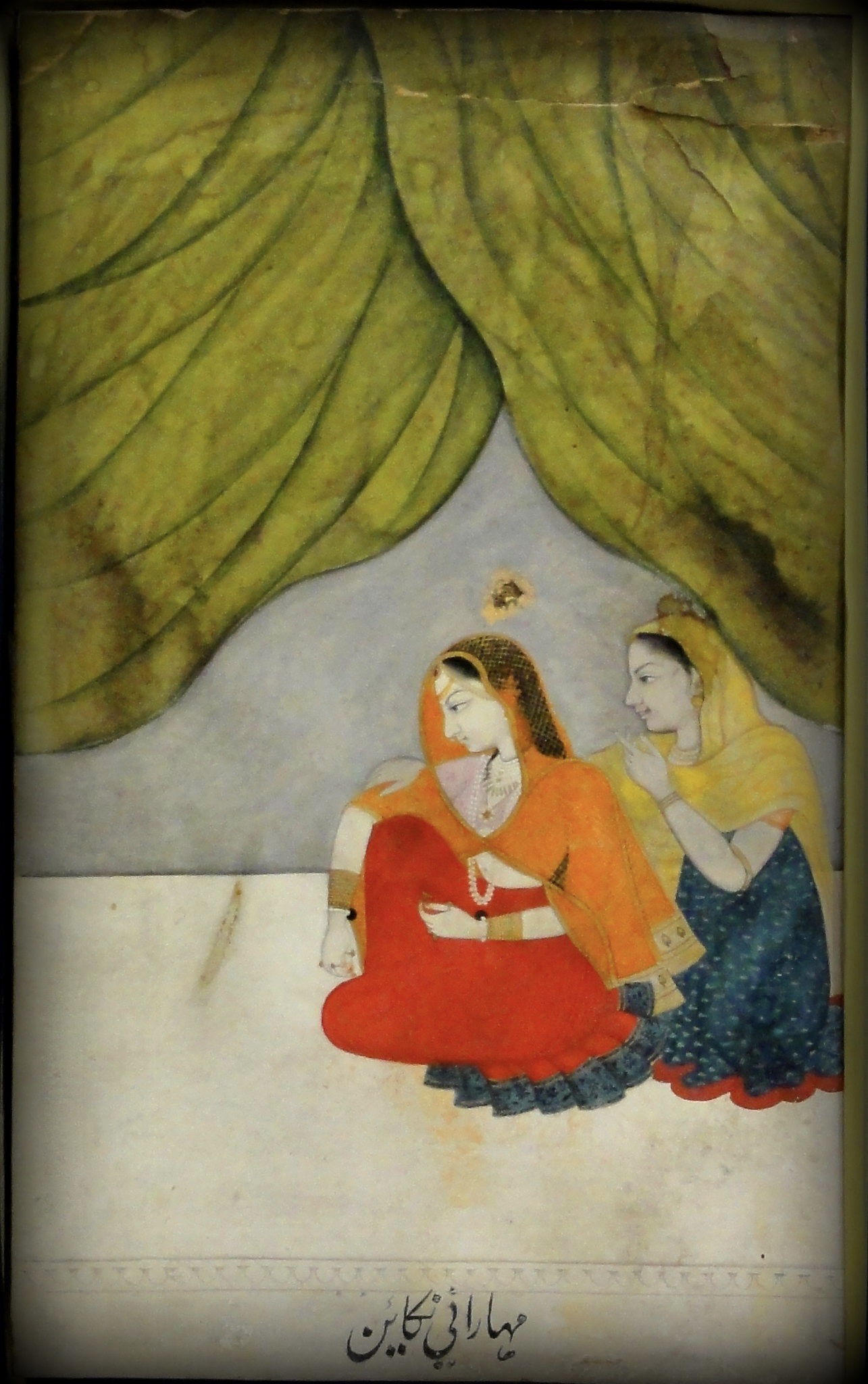
- Painting of Maharani Datar Kaur with her attendant, Wahi

Maharani consort of the Sikh Empire
- Tenure: 12 April 1801 – 20 June 1838
- Predecessor: Raj Kaur
- Successor: Chand Kaur

Sardarni of Sukerchakia Misl
- Tenure: April 1797 – 11 April 1801
- Predecessor: Raj Kaur
- Born: Bibi Raj Kaur Nakai c. 1784; Baherwal Kalan, Nakai Misl, Sikh Confederacy (present-day Kasur District, Punjab, Pakistan)
- Died: 20 June 1838 (aged 53–54); Sheikhupura Fort, Sheikhupura, Punjab, Sikh Empire (now Punjab, Pakistan)
- Burial: Royal Garden, Lahore (Samadhi) (present day Islamia College Civil Lines)
- Spouse: Maharaja Ranjit Singh (m. 1797)
- Issue: Maharaja Kharak Singh
- House: Nakai (by birth); Sukerchakia (by marriage)
- Father: Sardar Ran Singh Nakai
- Mother: Rani Karman Kaur
- Religion: Sikhism

Maharani Datar Kaur (born Bibi Raj Kaur Nakai; (c. 1784– 20 June 1838) was the queen consort of Maharaja Ranjit Singh, the founder of the Sikh Empire and the mother of his successor, Maharaja Kharak Singh. She was the daughter of Sardar Ran Singh Nakai, third ruler of the Nakai Misl and Sardarni Karman Kaur.

Datar Kaur was betrothed to Ranjit Singh in childhood; the Anand Karaj took place when the couple were still young. Though Ranjit Singh married several times for political reasons, Datar Kaur remained his favorite and most respected wife. He lovingly addressed her as Mai Nakain.

In 1801, she gave birth to Kharak Singh, the heir apparent of Ranjit Singh. She took an active interest in the affairs of the State and was given command during the Battle of Multan (1818) alongside her son, Kharak Singh. She was the grandmother of Maharaja Nau Nihal Singh (1821–1840) and aunt of Sardar Kahan Singh Nakai. Datar Kaur died on 20 June 1838 in her haveli in Sheikhupura.

Her Samadhi is located in the royal garden, now part of the grounds of Government Islamia College, Civil Lines, Lahore.

== Early Life and Family history ==
Bibi Raj Kaur was born in Baherwal Kalan into the family of the ruling Nakai Sardars; Nakai Misl was founded by Sandhu Jats.

Raj Kaur was the youngest child of Sardar Ran Singh Nakai and his wife, Sardarni Karmo Kaur. She was the granddaughter of Sardar Natha Singh (d. 1768) brother of the legendary Heera Singh Sandhu (1706–1767), founder of the principality of Nakai Misl in 1748. She had three elder brothers Sardar Bhagwan Singh, the fourth ruler of the Nakai Misl; Sardar Gyan Singh who became the fifth chief of the Nakais and Khazan Singh. Raj Kaur Nakai was described as the most intelligent and brightest among her siblings.

Her father, Ran Singh was the third and the most powerful ruler of Nakai Misl, a fierce warrior under whose leadership the misl was at its highest. He was an ambitious man and had exceeded his rule to the taluqas of Bucheke, Chhanga Manga, 69 km from Lahore, Chhichha, Devsal, Fatahpur, Jethupur, Kasur, Kharral fort of Kot Kamalia, Sharakpur, Gugera pargana, 5 km to the west of the Ravi, and Shergarh. He had fought repeatedly against Kamar Singh, the ruler of Syedwala. Sometime before his death, he defeated him and captured Syedwala.

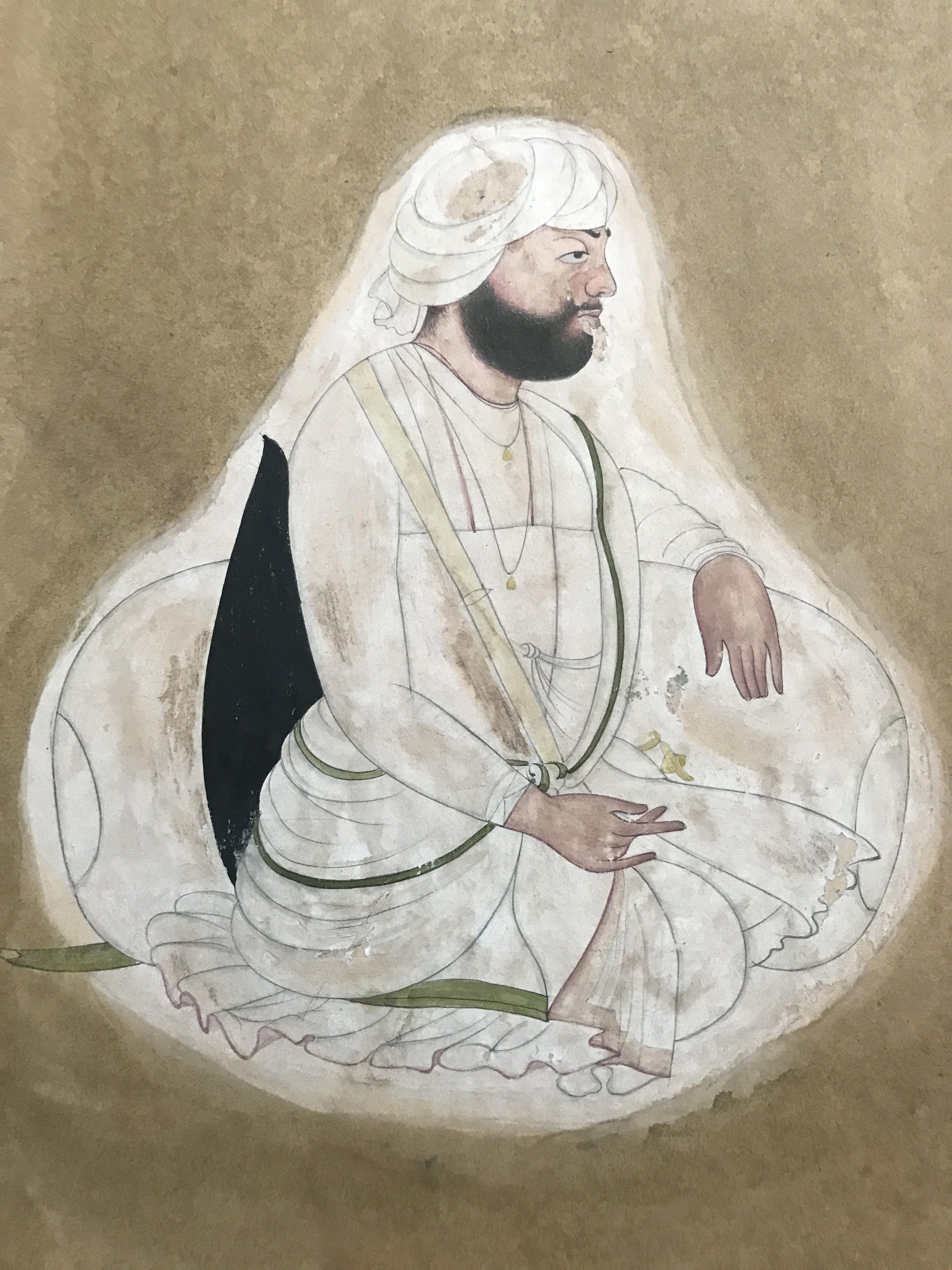
Sardar Bhagwan Singh Nakai, 4th ruler of the Nakai Misl

Ran Singh was succeeded by his eldest son Bhagwan Singh, he was unable to hold his territory against Wazir Singh, the brother of Kamar Singh and lost Syedwala to him. Bhagwan Singh realizing that he might lose all of his territory, in consultation with Karmo Kaur, set up the engagement of the infant Raj Kaur to the four-year-old Ranjit Singh in order to gain the powerful Maha Singh of the Sukerchakia Misl as an ally. Wazir Singh tried to break off this match, but was unable to do so. In an attempt to mislead her, Wazir Singh claimed that the Nakai Sandhu Jatts are superior to the Sukerchakias, but Karmo Kaur refused to break off the match and stated as Sikhs all were equal.

Later in 1785, Maha Singh was facing attacks from Sardar Jai Singh Kanhaiya of the Kanhaiya Misl and called on Bhagwan Singh and Wazir Singh to aid him. After their victory against the Kanhaiyas, Maha Singh began to favor Wazir Singh, which started to affect his relationship with Bhagwan Singh. Maha Singh tried to reconcile the differences between Bhagwan Singh and Wazir Singh, but they continued to engage in constant warfare and in 1789 the former was killed by Wazir Singh.

Since Bhagwan Singh had no children, he was succeeded by his brother, Gyan Singh as the head of the Nakai Misl in 1789. With the family's old enemy Wazir Singh being killed by Dal Singh, son of Heera Singh Sandhu, Gyan Singh had a relatively peaceful reign and was able to consolidate his power.

== Marriage ==
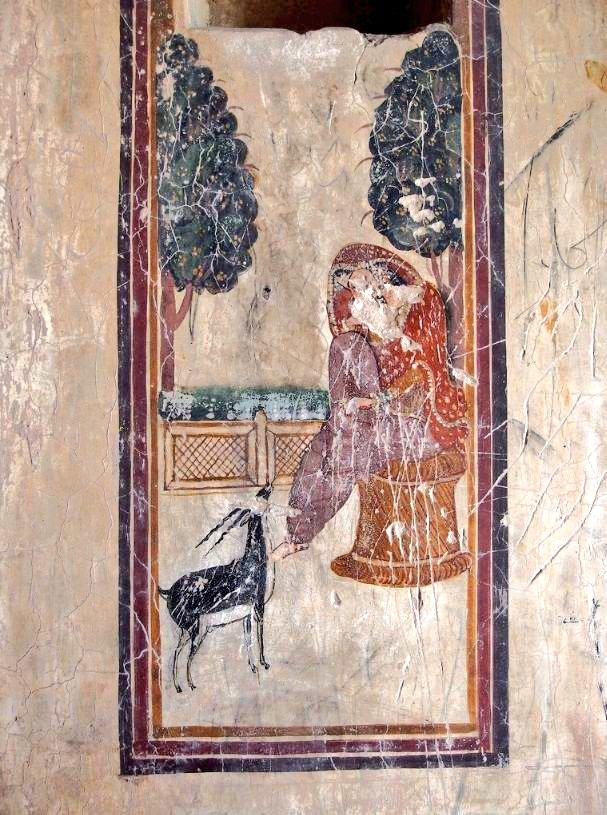
Fresco from the Haveli of Maharani Datar Kaur, Sheikhpura Qila (fort), Punjab

According to historian Iqbal Qaiser, Raj Kaur Nakai is said to have attracted the attention of the young Ranjit Singh when Sikh sardars gathered in Amritsar in 1797 to discuss the situation arising from Zaman Shah Durrani’s invasion of Punjab. Qaiser describes Raj Kaur as a beautiful, good-natured and affectionate woman, characterising her as a “gentle and selfless person”. Plus they were betrothed for quite some time. He wanted to unite the Sikh Misls and consolidate his position as the head of the Sukerchakia Misl, as well as to re-establish Nakai and Sukerchakia relations.

Gyan Singh agreed for the nuptials of Raj Kaur and Ranjit Singh and the couple were wedded in 1797, she is said to be only 12 at the time of her wedding to the 16-year-old Ranjit Singh. This marriage was the first marital alliance of the Sukerchakia Misl and the Nakai Misl.

Though the nuptials of Datar Kaur and Ranjit Singh were arranged for political reasons, the two shared a close and loving relationship. Sam Dalrymple states that she was the only woman that Ranjit Singh truly loved.

Her known physical attributes describe her as being doe eyed and beautiful, she is said to have possessed a fair complexion. She was renowned for her intelligence, independent nature, calm disposition, and innate dignity, carrying herself with a gentle grace that endeared her husband. Mai Nakain was fond of arts and craft as well, her artistic sensibilities are reflected in the Sheikhupura Fort as well as her personal Haveli in Wachoowali Mohalla of Shahalmi bazar. Kaur took a personal interest in the arrangement and adornment of her residence.

In Royals and Rebels, historian Priya Atwal discusses how Mai Nakain restored her Sheikhupura residence and commissioned Pahari artists to decorate its interior apartments. The imagery of her personal chambers included lovers meeting and parting, Krishna and the gopis, dancing women, and guards near entrances. Datar wanted her apartments to be a place where she could spend romantic time with her husband and enjoy the beauties of nature.

She was also very religious. She is said to have been a patron of mystics and mendiants.

Since Raj Kaur was the name of her mother-in-law, as well as Ranjit Singh's aunt the daughter of Charat Singh and Desan Kaur; To avoid confusion, the wife of Ranjit Singh, Raj Kaur Nakai was given the name "Datar" (ਦਾਤਾਰ) (داتار) which means 'Giver', due to her maternal gentleness and understanding in dealing with the wayward Ranjit Singh. He lovingly called Mai Nakain, sometimes affectionately addressed her as Taare. Datar Kaur brought sweetness and light into Ranjit Singh's life and provided for him a focus of interest in his home. Even though Ranjit Singh had many marriages, Datar Kaur remained his favourite.

She had significant influence over her husband, the royal family and the royal court. Her sweet nature helped maintain a warm and harmonious atmosphere within the household. There is no record of any friction or mutual differences between Datar Kaur or the other wives of Ranjit Singh, but there were instances of tension between her and Mehtab Kaur after the she bore Ranjit Singh's first child. As the younger queen bearing the heir left Mehtab Kaur in a very difficult position. This also left Sada Kaur's plans to secure the future of her daughter and the Kanhaiyas in tatters. Ranjit Singh and Mehtab Kaur's marriage was strained due to Mehtab never being able to forgive that her father was killed in battle with Ranjit Singh's father; and she mainly resided in Batala with her mother.

In some historical accounts, mistakenly, marriage of Ranjit Singh has been mentioned with two daughters of Nakai Misl i.e. Raj Kaur and Datar Kaur. However, she was one and the same person.

=== Issue and descendants ===
In 1801, she gave birth to Crown Prince Kharak Singh, the heir apparent of the Sikh Empire earning her the title of Ranjit Singh's queen consort.

According to the pedigree table of the Lahore Royal Family she bore Ranjit Singh two other sons Rattan Singh and Fateh Singh, who died in infancy.

In 2020, Sandeep Singh Sukerchakia, 7th generation great-grandson of Maharaja Ranjit Singh and Maharani Datar Kaur from their son Rattan Singh, wrote a detailed letter to Narendra Modi, the Prime Minister of India insisting the inclusion of Punjabi Language in the New Jammu and Kashmir official Language Bill of 2020.

Her other descendants include- Late Lt Gen Jagdishwar Singh Nakai who joined the Indian army just when the Second World War broke out and served in the Burma Campaign. He was later to see action in all subsequent wars of independent India till his retirement in 1979 after serving as the General Officer in Command, Central Command. Lt Gen Nakai was a recipient of the Param Vishisht Seva Medal. Former Chief Minister of Punjab (Pakistan), Sardar Arif Nakai and Pakistani politician, Sardar Asif Nakai are also the direct descendants of the Nakais.

== Maharani of the Sikh Empire ==
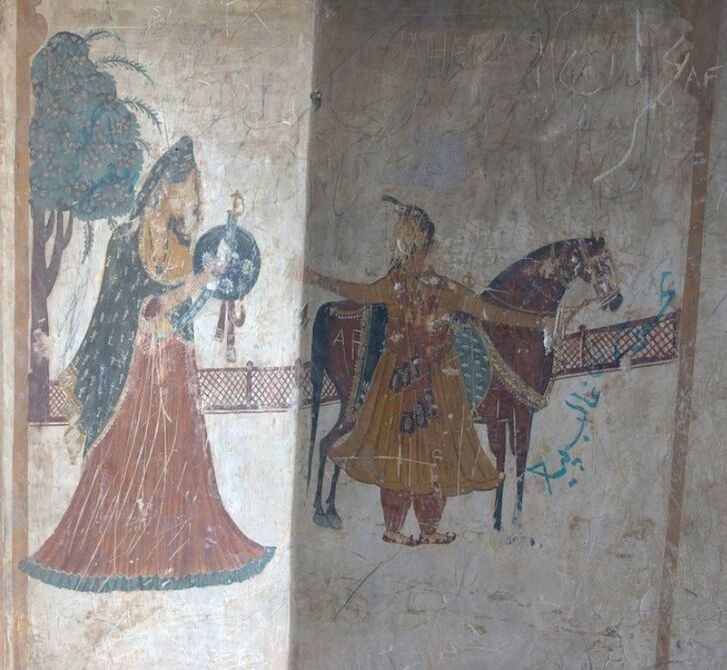
Fresco of Maharani Datar Kaur martially training her son, Kharak Singh

Datar Kaur took interest in political affairs, and her husband sought her advice in important stately matters. Though she was Ranjit Singh’s second wife but she became his principal wife and chief consort.

Though historian Jean-Marie Lafont, in his biography of Maharaja Ranjit Singh, wrote that Mehtab Kaur was the only one to bear the title of Maharani, contemporary court chronicles refer to Datar Kaur as the Maharani and principal consort of Ranjit Singh. The court chronicle of Ranjit Singh, Umdat-ut-Tawarikh only refers to Datar Kaur as his queen consort.

According to Mufti Ali-ud-Din, Raj Kaur Nakai was renowned for her beauty in Kasur, attracting considerable attention, much to her mother’s displeasure. Her mother consequently kept her secluded behind the veil. Ali-ud-Din further states that Raj Kaur continued to observe strict purdah after her marriage, describing her as remaining within the “veils of chastity”. Sohan Lal Suri also makes reference to her seclusion and observance of purdah.

During the wedding celebrations of her son, Prince Kharak Singh, Maharani Datar Kaur joined the Baraat in an opulent chariot made from gold and adorned with diamonds and other precious gems gifted to her by Maharaja Ranjit Singh. The display was a striking demonstration of both her status within the Lahore Darbar and the esteem in which she was held by the Maharaja. Historian Priya Atwal has suggested that this grand procession may have carried symbolic significance beyond mere royal spectacle. She speculates that Datar Kaur’s appearance in a richly decorated chariot could have evoked associations with Subhadra, the wife of Arjuna and one of the three deities worshipped at the Jagannath Temple who rides in a ceremonial ratha during the annual Rath Yatra festival. Given Ranjit Singh’s well-documented patronage of the Jagannath Temple and his famous deathbed wish to donate the Koh-i-Noor diamond to the temple’s priests, Atwal cautiously proposes that the elaborate display may have been intended to cast Mai Nakain in the image of Subhadra.

On many different occasions, Datar Kaur served as her husband's ambassador; even acting as a political proxy for him. It is said that Maharani Nakain wielded a legendary amount of influence on Maharaja Ranjit Singh.

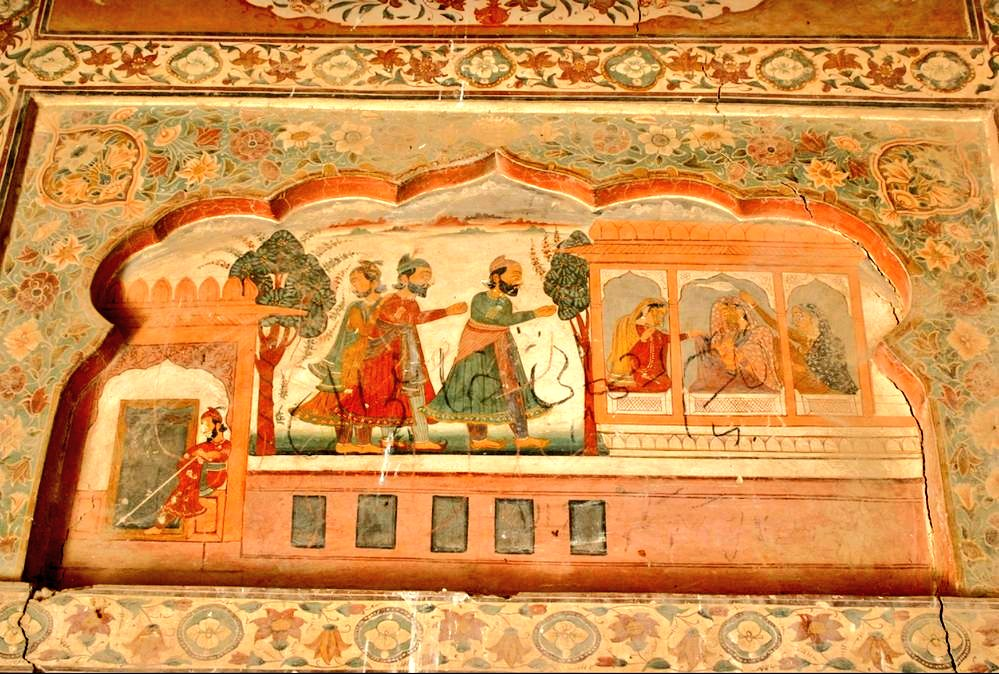
Fresco of Maharani Datar Kaur holding her court at Sheikhupura

Mai Nakain took control of the Sheikhupura Fort when her six-year-old son, Kharak Singh had conquered it. In 1811, she was officially granted the jagir of Sheikhupura by Maharaja Ranjit Singh. Around the same time she started residing in the Sheikhupura Fort and held her own court. She enjoyed hunting and often accompanied her husband on his hunting trips. Sheikhupura has a vicinity of good hunting places.

Since his birth, her son was the heir of Ranjit Singh. When Kharak Singh was merely an year old he was paraded through the streets of Lahore as his father’s heir and Punjab's prince. In 1816, Ranjit Singh crowned Kharak Singh as his heir apparent and anointed him "Yuvraj Shri Tikka Kanwar" (Crown prince). The same year she took over her son's training for 18 months for his Expedition of Multan.

In 1818, she accompanied her son to the campaign of Multan as a commander to. The Sikh Khalsa Army was under her command during the Battle of Multan (1818).

She played a considerable role in popularizing handicrafts like Phulkari knitting and fine arts in Punjab. Mai Nakain was also a patron of religious mystics and mendicants.

== Sukerchakia-Nakai relationship ==
Even though his favourite Rani was from the house of the Nakais, Ranjit Singh's relationship with the Nakais was somewhat rocky. Nakais did not find the alliance with Ranjit Singh much useful to them.

After Ranjit Singh had declared himself the Maharaja of Punjab in 1801 he had kept consolidating majority of the Misls. The ambitious Maharaja had been eyeing the Nakai territory, but had spared it out if respect for his brother-in-law, Sardar Gyan Singh. However after his death in 1807 he suggested Sardar Kahan Singh Nakai, who succeeded his father as the sixth chief of the Nakais to join the Lahore Darbar, which the proud newly crowned Nakai chief steadily refused to obligate. Finally, in 1811, Ranjit Singh sent Kharak Singh to annex all the Nakai territories; Sardar Kahan Singh came back from Multan to find his cousin Kharak Singh has taken over his misl. Diwan Hakim Rai, the administer of the Nakai Chief, immediately approached Ranjit Singh with the request that it was not proper for the Lahore forces to take military action against his nephew's misl. Sohan Lai Suri notes that the Maharaja, very politely, said "I have nothing to do in this matter, Kunwar Kharak Singh is the maternal grandson of the Nakais and only he knows as to what is to be done."

Before having his estates seized Kahan Singh was successful in conquering Pakpattan. Ranjit Singh granted Kahan Singh jagir at Baherwal while his brother-in-law, Khazan Singh was granted a jagir at Nankot. Sardar Kahan Singh continued to live in Baharwal and the Nakais remained loyal to Maharaja Ranjit Singh.

== Death ==
Datar Kaur died in Sheikhupura on June 20, 1838. Sohan Lal Suri in Umdat-ut-Tawarikh, writes that both the Maharaja and Maharani returned from a hunting trip to Sheikhupura and fell ill. While Ranjit recovered, she died. Kharak Singh was inconsolable by the death of his mother. The Royal Lahore Garden was chosen for her Samadhi, the site was chosen by Ranjit himself and Suri mentions for the first time he saw the Maharaja cry. Ranjit Singh wanted the finest for his wife, hence the Royal Garden was chosen and the ashes of Mai Nakain were placed.

Ranjit Singh and Datar Kaur shared a very loving and close relationship. After her death, Ranjit Singh fell sick and died shortly.

The missionary reported,

"The Maharajah was never the same person again. He was no longer able to mount his horse himself and had to be lifted into the saddle. His recovery was retarded by the death of Mai Nakain, his favourite wife and companion of over forty years . He took the Nakain's death to heart and brooded over it a long time"

Claude Martin Wade had brought the Tripartite Treaty of 1838 to be signed at her funeral.

== Legacy ==
Her samadhi is located in Lahore nearby the Tomb of Anarkali and is now within the campus of Government Islamia College, Civil Lines. It is also the resting place of her daughter-in-law, Maharani Chand Kaur and grand daughter-in-law, Sahib Kaur wife of Nau Nihal Singh.

== In popular culture ==
- Datar Kaur was a portrayed by Navneet Cheema in the TV series titled Maharaja Ranjit Singh which aired on DD National. The series was produced by Raj Babbar.
- Datar Kaur is a principal character in Chitra Banerjee Divakaruni's The Last Queen.

== See also ==
- Misl
- Misl Nakai
- Sardar Ran Singh Nakai
- Maharaja Ranjit Singh
- Sikh Empire
- Sardar Heera Singh Sandhu
- Maharaja Kharak Singh

== Notes ==
- Suri, Sohan Lal, Umddt ut-Twarikh. Lahore, 1885–89.
- Ganda Singh, ed., Maharaja Ranjit Singh (First Death Centenary Memorial Volume)
