= Shah Purah =

Village in Punjab, Pakistan

Shah Purah is a small village north of the city of Bucheki, Nankana Sahib District in the Punjab province of Pakistan.
