= Kull, Punjab =

Kull
- Town
- Location within Pakistan
- Coordinates: 30°56′56″N 73°44′36″E
- Country: Pakistan
- Province: Punjab
- District: Kasur
- Time zone: UTC+5 (PST)

Kull is a town and Union Council of Kasur District in the Punjab province of Pakistan. It is one of the 24 Union Councils of the district's Chunian Tehsil.
