= Mundayki =

- Town
- Location within Pakistan
- Coordinates: 30°56′56″N 73°44′36″E
- Country: Pakistan
- Province: Punjab
- District: Kasur
- Time zone: UTC+5 (PST)

Mundayki is a town and Union Council of Kasur District in the Punjab province of Pakistan. It is part of Chunian Tehsil and is located at 31°3'30N 73°51'20E with an altitude of 189 metres (623 feet).
