= Chak Jethpur =

- Village
- Location in Punjab, India Chak Jethpur (India)
- Coordinates: 31.347323°N 75.7445451°E
- Country: India
- State: Punjab
- District: Jalandhar

Government
  - Type: Panchayat raj
  - Body: Gram panchayat
- Elevation: 240 m (790 ft)

Languages
  - Official: Punjabi
- Time zone: UTC+5:30 (IST)
- ISO 3166 code: IN-PB
- Website: jalandhar.nic.in

Chak Jethpur is a census town in Jalandhar district of Punjab State, India. It is located 27 kilometres (17 mi) from Jalandhar and 142 kilometres (88 mi) from state capital Chandigarh. The village is administrated by a sarpanch who is an elected representative of village as per Panchayati raj (India).

== See also ==
- List of villages in India
