= Mussapur =

- Village
- Location in Punjab, India Mussapur (India)
- Coordinates: 31.341582°N 75.7558585°E
- Country: India
- State: Punjab
- District: Jalandhar
- Tehsil: Jalandhar - I

Government
  - Type: Panchayat raj
  - Body: Gram panchayat

Area
  - Total: 17 ha (42 acres)
- Elevation: 213.2 m (699 ft)

Population (2011)
  - Total: 740; 383/357 ♂/♀
  - Scheduled Castes: 219; 108/111 ♂/♀
  - Total Households: 164

Languages
  - Official: Punjabi
- Time zone: UTC+5:30 (IST)
- ISO 3166 code: IN-PB
- Vehicle registration: PB-08
- Website: jalandhar.gov.in

Mussapur is a village in Jalandhar - I in Jalandhar district of Punjab State, India. It is located 25 kilometres (16 mi) from district headquarter. The village is administrated by Sarpanch an elected representative of the village.

== Demography ==
As of 2011, the village has a total number of 164 houses and a population of 740 of which 383 are males while 357 are females. According to the report published by Census India in 2011, out of the total population of the village 219 people are from Schedule Caste and the village does not have any Schedule Tribe population so far.

== See also ==
- List of villages in India
