= Chak 18 =

Chak No. 18 Rakh Mundeke Khurad
- Village
- Location within Pakistan
- Coordinates: 30°56′56″N 73°44′36″E
- Country: Pakistan
- Province: Punjab
- District: Kasur
- Time zone: UTC+5 (PST)

Chak No. 18 is a village located 70 kilometres (43 mi) from Lahore, the provincial capital of Punjab, Pakistan. Its another Real and old name is that of Rakh Mundy Ki Khurad. Chak18 is near the Changa Manga wildlife park. The economy is based on agriculture. It was settled in British India in 1906 on the bank of a canal.

The name "Rakh Mundeke" is derived from two words: "Rakh," meaning forest, and "Mundeke," which refers to a village from where Chak 18 is derived. Khurd meaning small and its opposite respectively is Kalal, holds a history dating back to its establishment in British India in 1906 near a canal. Situated close to the Changa Manga wildlife park, the village plays a pivotal role in the region's agrarian landscape, with agriculture forming the backbone of its economy.

Prominent places within the village include the Union Council Office, four mosques, a graveyard, Govt Girls Middle School, Govt Boys High school, Basic Health Unit, a large sewage pond, Imam Bargah Qasre Fatima, Mazar Baba Said Shah, and Haveli Dildar Shah hosting Anza Dildar Foundation's mini hospital every Sunday.

The majority of Syeds in Chak No. 18 belong to the Mashhadi tribe, tracing their roots to Iran. The village is unique in District Kasur for having a substantial Shia community, marked by landmarks like the Imam Bargah Qasar e Fatima and the shrine of Baba Said.
