= Bucheki =

Bucheki Nankana sahib, Punjab
- City
- Bucheki
- Location within Pakistan
- Coordinates: 31.18°N 73.39°E
- Country: Pakistan
- Province: Punjab
- District: Nankana Sahib

Area
  - Total: 43 km^{2} (17 sq mi)
- Elevation: 179 m (587 ft)

Population (2019)
  - Total: 276,391
- Calling code: 056
- Website: www.bucheki.com

Bucheki or Bucheke is a city in the Nankana Sahib District, Punjab province, Pakistan. It is located at 31°18'18N 73°39'34E and has an altitude of 180 meters (590 feet). It is about 80 km west of Lahore and 15 km south of Nankana Sahib (the birthplace of Guru Nanak Sahib).

Bucheki connects to the village of Shah Purah in the north via the Sayyedwala road. The Nala Daik river passes through the middle of the town. The city has expanded its size to 14 km^{2} by absorbing 16 nearby villages into its area. It has a total population of 276,391 people according to the 2019 census.

As a rich aroma rice growing area, the city is known for its more than 70 rice mills and its markets exporting rice to international destinations.

== City sectors ==
Bucheki's main bazaar has merchants selling goods ranging from books to jewellery. The grain and nut market is open during the harvest seasons for wheat (May – June) and rice (September – November). During this time, large crowds come and trucks loaded with exported and imported crops enter the city. The city has a significantly larger shopping complex than neighbouring towns, thus attracting people from surrounding communities to fill their shopping needs.

In Bucheki there are two dominant Tribes, Manj Rajputs and Manais Jutts. Manj Rajputs mostly known as Majors are migrants who migrated from India in 1947 and settled in Bucheki. Both of the tribes are largest landowning families in the Bucheki. The Majors are a politically active and influential tribe. The Manj are so called Majors because their family have many Army Officers and so known as a Military family.

The postal code for Bucheki is 39130. This post office operates from Qila Sheikhupura postal office. This postal office is located in the Punjab province in Pakistan, it is a general post office and has an attached branch office within it. The postal code of the attached branch postal office is 39131.

== Politics ==
During the elections, Bucheki dominated the headquarters of the constituencies of both the national assemblies (NA 137) and the provincial assembly (PP 174). In the past, Bucheki has played a crucial part for the constituency by electing numerous leaders who have come and gone. Manjs always lead the area and elected as MPA.
