= Baherwal Kalan =

- Village
- Location within Pakistan
- Coordinates: 30°56′56″N 73°44′36″E
- Country: Pakistan
- Province: Punjab
- District: Kasur
- Time zone: UTC+5 (PST)

Baherwal Kalan is a village in the Kasur District of Punjab, Pakistan. The neighboring villages are Bhonikey, Rore, Taragarh, Khudian, Chak 41, Jaguwala and Kot Het Ram. It is the birthplace of Maharani Datar Kaur, wife of Maharaja Ranjit Singh and the mother of his successor, Maharaja Kharak Singh.

== History ==
Guru Arjan Dev Ji (1563–1606) fifth Sikh Guru was touring the Nakka area of Punjab located between river Ravi and river Sutlej with some of his Sikhs. Sandhu Jatt Chaudhary Hem Raj (Chieftain) of Baherwal Kalan respected and served Guru Arjan Dev Ji. The Guru blessed him saying that his descendants will be great Chieftains of that area. Guru Sahib left for Jamber Kalan Village near Bhai Phero Town.

== Nakai Misl ==
Sardar Hira Singh (1706–1767), a Sandhu Jatt descendant of Chaudhary Hem Raj, took the area from the Afghans in 1748. In 1749 he took Dipalpur, Okara, Kanganpur Afghans and Gogaira from chaudhri Kamar Singh Sandhu. He had taken Amrit Sanchaar (Sikh Initiation) in 1731 from Nawab Kapur Singh, the leader of the Sikh confederacy in the Punjab. He named his territory Nakai Misl after the 'Nakka' name of area. He also built an army from neighboring villages around Baherwal Kalan.

Baherwal was Hira Singh Nakai's capital. During an expedition to Pakpattan City, he was shot and killed by Muslim forces in 1767. His army cremated his body in his native Village. He had a son, Dal Singh, who was still a young boy, so his nephew, Nar Singh, became the next Chieftain. Nar Singh was killed in 1768 by the Kharal Jats of Kot Kumaliah. His son Sardar Ran Singh (d.1781) became the next leader.

After Ran Singh's death in 1781, his son, Sardar Bhagwan Singh Nakai, became ruler until his death in 1789. He was succeeded by his brother Gyan Singh Nakai, who in 1798 married his sister Raj Kaur (d.1838) to Maharaja Ranjit Singh at a young age. She assumed the name Maharani Datar Kaur after marriage. After Gyan Singh Nakai's death in 1807, Kahan Singh became the next and final ruler. In 1810 Maharaja Ranjit Singh annexed their territories and granted the Jagir of Baherwal to Kahan Singh. Sardar Kahan Singh Nakai did not take active interest in politics after the death of Maharaja Ranjit Singh. He continued to live in Baherwal till his death in 1873.

== Descendants of Nakai Misl ==
Their descendants achieved much fame during British Rule (1849–1947). In the early 20th century, Sardar Ishar Singh Nakai of Baherwal Kalan, married a Muslim woman and converted to Islam. He took the name Abdul Aziz Nakai. His grandson was Sardar Muhammad Arif Nakai Sandhu, a noted Pakistani politician who rose to become the Chief Minister of Punjab. He died on February 29, 2000.

During the partition in 1947, the Sikh zamindars and landlords and Hindu bankers and grocery shop owners left for East Punjab India and the Muhajirs Muslims from Delhi migrated to Pakistan Kasur.

=== See also ===
1. Beharwal Kalan

2. Nakai Misl

3. Misl Nakai

4. Sardar Muhammad Arif Nakai

5. Maharani Datar Kaur
