= Baharwal =

Baharwal باہروال
- Town and union council
- Location in Pakistan
- Coordinates: 32°45′55″N 73°56′18″E
- Country: Pakistan
- Province: Punjab
- Division: Gujrat
- District: Gujrat
- Tehsil: Kharian
- Thana: Guliana
- Time zone: UTC+5 (PST)

Baharwal (Urdu-Punjabi; باہروال) is a town and union council of Gujrat District, in the Punjab province of Pakistan. It is part of Kharian Tehsil and located at an altitude of 264 metres (869 feet).
