= Chunian =

Town in Punjab, Pakistan

Chunian چُونياں
- City
- Location of Chunian Chunian (Pakistan) Chunian (South Asia) Chunian (Asia)
- Coordinates: 31°1′N 73°51′E
- Country: Pakistan
- Province: Punjab
- District: Kasur District

Government
  - Type: Municipal Committee
- Elevation: 186 m (610 ft)

Population (2023 Census)
  - Total: 87,547
  - Rank: 147th in Pakistan
- Time zone: UTC+5 (PST)

Chunian (Urdu: چُونياں), is a historic city and the capital of Chunian Tehsil of Punjab, Pakistan. It is located at 30° 58' N 73° 51' E and at an elevation of 177 meters (583 feet), and lies about 70 km south of Lahore, the capital of Punjab. It is the headquarters of a tehsil or revenue sub-division of the same name in Kasur District. Before 1976 this city was the part or tehsil of Lahore district. The city is administratively subdivided into two union councils.

As per census, Chunian city had a population of 47,600 people in the year 1998 . It is located on the Pattoki-Kasur road at a major junction of local roads. The city is located on the right bank of the former Beas River bed. Beas changed its course several centuries ago.

Some important places around Chunian include Gillan Wala, Dhose, Sadha Otar, Gurdas Walla, Bhemkie, Charkey, Kott Ch. Allah Ditta, Ellah Abad and Gehlan Hithar. Gehlan Hithar has almost 400 years of rich cultural history.

== Economy ==
The tehsil is known for the Changa Manga forest which is the largest single plantation of trees in Pakistan. Chunian Industrial Estate is one of the largest concentration of manufacturing in the country near Kashif Chok (Kashif Petrolium) bypass Chunian. The city is a busy regional market for agricultural produce. In 2016, the Government of Pakistan created an industrial zone on the outskirts of the city to provide a boost to the local economy.

== Demographics ==
Population

Historical population
Year	Pop.	±%
1972	16,557	—
1981	24,521	+48.1%
1998	42,230	+72.2%
2017	72,589	+71.9%
2023	87,547	+20.6%

According to the 2023 census, Chunian city has a population of 87,547 inhabitants.

== History ==
The present city is more than 500 years old. Some parts of the city fortification and several of its old gates still exist. The city is built on a mound believed to have been built during the Indus Valley Civilisation but very little excavation has been sought to confirm this. The Archeology Department, Government of Pakistan carried out the last excavation in 1978. Among other objects, coins dating back to Alexander the Great's time (c. 323 BC) were discovered at the site. A large area of unexcavated mounds extends to the south-west of the city where ancient bricks and shards of pottery can be found on the surface. Legends believe that the city has been destroyed nine times in the past.

The present name is popularly believed to have been derived from 'Chunni', name of a daughter of Raja Todar Mal, the dewan or revenue minister to Mughal emperor Akbar the Great. Little historical evidence of this belief has been documented. People of nearby villages call the city Chooni in local dialect of Punjabi. There is a baradari in Chunian of Raja Todar Mal.

Chunian was the capital of the Nakai dynasty one of the 12 Sikh dynasties (misls) which ruled in modern-day Kasur and Okara Districts.

During the 2025 India–Pakistan conflict, as a part of Operation Sindoor, India claimed that it had conducted air and missile strikes on Pakistani military installations in Chunian on 10 May, 2025.

== Climate ==
Climate data for Chunian
Month	Jan	Feb	Mar	Apr	May	Jun	Jul	Aug	Sep	Oct	Nov	Dec	Year
Mean daily maximum °C (°F)	18 (64)	20 (68)	25 (77)	32 (90)	47 (117)	48 (118)	43 (109)	43 (109)	32 (90)	31 (88)	25 (77)	19 (66)	32 (89)
Mean daily minimum °C (°F)	04 (39)	11 (52)	16 (61)	22 (72)	26 (79)	28 (82)	28 (82)	27 (81)	26 (79)	20 (68)	13 (55)	03 (37)	19 (66)
Average precipitation mm (inches)	16 (0.6)	14 (0.6)	13 (0.5)	8 (0.3)	10 (0.4)	29 (1.1)	90 (3.5)	102 (4.0)	49 (1.9)	5 (0.2)	2 (0.1)	6 (0.2)	344 (13.4)
Source: weather2stay
