= Gehlan Hithar =

- Town
- Location within Pakistan
- Coordinates: 30°56′56″N 73°44′36″E
- Country: Pakistan
- Province: Punjab
- District: Kasur
- Time zone: UTC+5 (PST)

Gehlan Hithar is a town and Union Council of Kasur District, situated some 65 miles south west of Lahore, Punjab, Pakistan. It is located at 30°52'0N 74°1'60E with an altitude of 174 metres (574 feet) and lies on the main Kasur-Okara road.

It lies in the boundaries of National Assembly constituency NA 133 and Provincial constituency PP 180. Ex foreign minister Khurshid Mahmud Kasuri was MNA from this area. Currently MNA Dr. Azeem ud Din Zahid Lukhvi Ch. Ahsan Raza MPA

Local Politician Ch. Allah Dita, Ch. Abdul Khaliq, Ch. Muhammad Din, Ch. Muhammad Saddique Javed, Ch. Ameer Ali Sabir, Ch. Javed Shamshad as Union Chairman's

The livelihood of the people is based on agriculture with a big share of flower growing beside wheat, rice and vegetables including potatoes and maize. The flower Largest Market established on the main Depalpur road is hub of fresh flower business in Punjab particularly and Pakistan as well.

The history of Gehlan is described in a book titled "Gehlan Hithar. "Gehlan Hithar - Almost 700 people from this town are in the teaching profession, 500 people are serving in armed forces and around 250 people are in police department and about 300 people are serving in other countries like "South Korea, UAE, Saudi Arabia, United Kingdom (UK), United States and Canada and others countries. There is lot of Jatt Gehlan in India and Hithar is area name in southern Lahore division of Punjab, Pakistan.Gehlan are Saini although they are in small number but scattered all around the Punjab (Pakistan & India). Majority of them found in Hoshiarpur, Punjab (India), Kasur, Jehlam, Okara and others Districts in Punjab (Pakistan).
