= Kharak Singh =

Maharaja of the Sikh Empire in 1839

Maharaja Kharak Singh
- Maharaja of Punjab; Maharaja of Lahore; Sarkar-i-Wallah; Sarkar Khalsaji
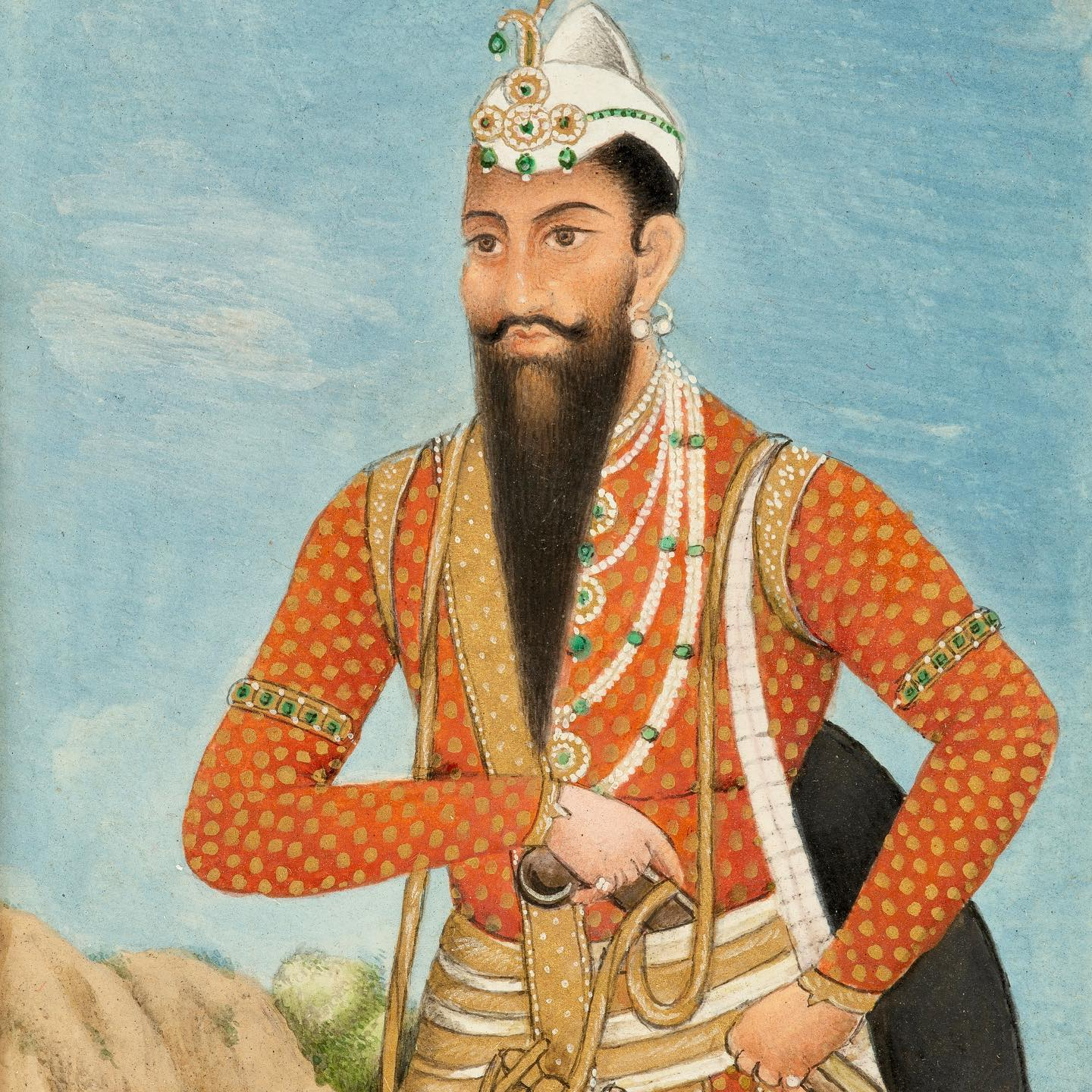
- Detail of a painting of Maharaja Kharak Singh, Punjab or Delhi, circa early-to-mid 19th century

Maharaja of Punjab, Kashmir and Jammu
- Reign: 27 June 1839 – 8 October 1839
- Coronation: 1 September 1839
- Predecessor: Ranjit Singh
- Successor: Nau Nihal Singh
- Wazir: Dhian Singh
- Born: 22 February 1801; Lahore, Punjab, Sikh Empire
- Died: 5 November 1840 (aged 39); Lahore, Punjab, Sikh Empire
- Consort: Chand Kaur Kanhaiyā
- Spouses: Bibi Khem Kaur Dhillon; Kishan Kaur Samra; Inder Kaur Bajwa
- Issue: Nau Nihal Singh
- House: Sukerchakia
- Dynasty: Sikh Empire
- Father: Ranjit Singh
- Mother: Datar Kaur Nakai
- Religion: Sikhism

Kharak Singh (22 February 1801 – 5 November 1840) was the second maharaja of the Sikh Empire, ruling from June 1839 until his dethronement and imprisonment in October 1839. He was the eldest son of Maharaja Ranjit Singh, founder of the Sikh Empire, and his consort, Maharani Datar Kaur. Kharak was succeeded by his only son, Nau Nihal Singh.

== Early life ==
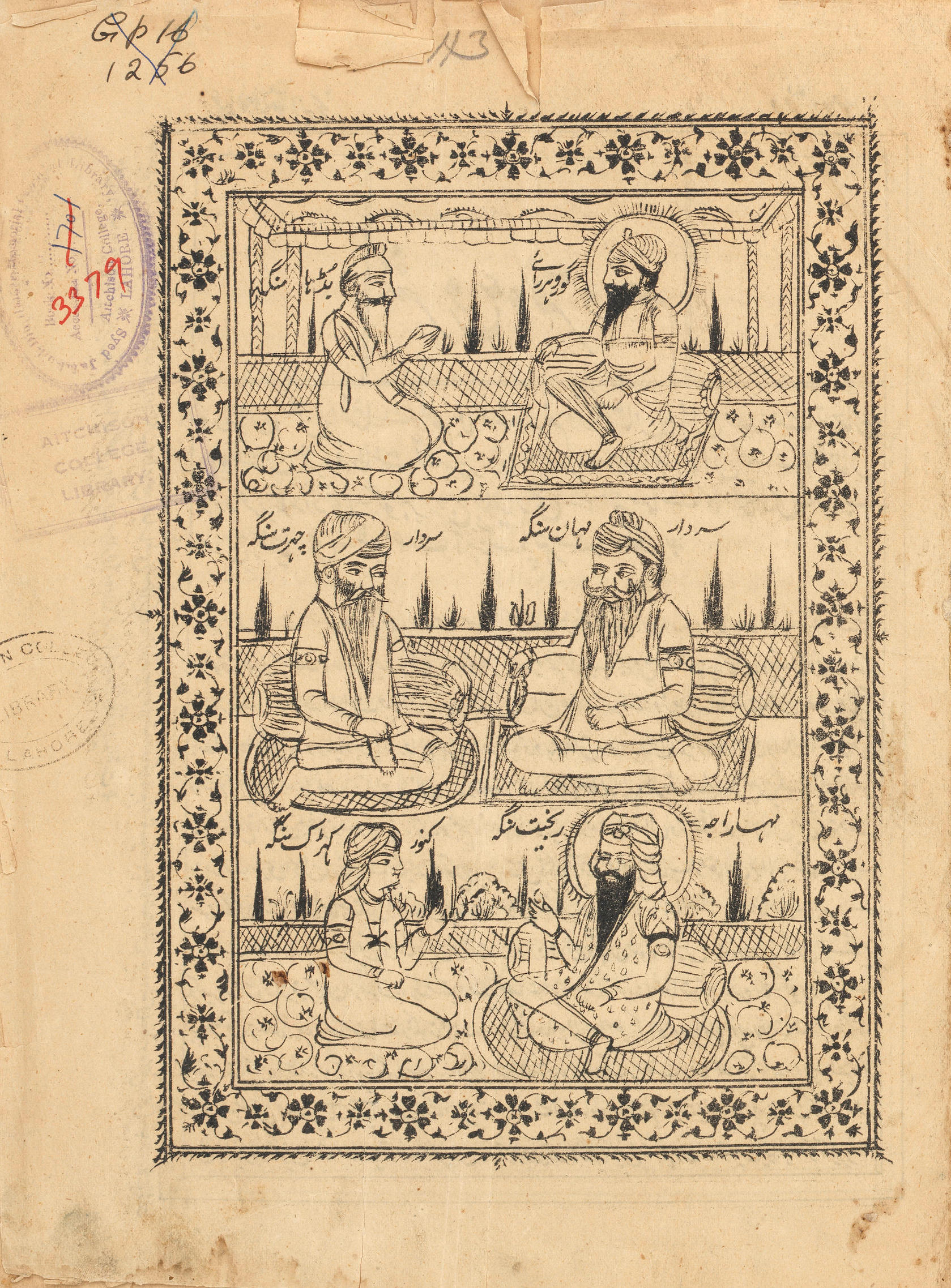
Young Kunwar Kharak Singh (bottom left) sits opposite his father, Maharaja Ranjit Singh. Top row features Sardar Budh Singh of Sukerchak paying respects to Shri Guru Har Rai ji (top right). Middle row features Sardar Charat Singh (left) and his son Sardar Mahan Singh (right). Image is from Umdat-ut-tawarikh (vol. II).

Kharak Singh was born on 22 February 1801 in Lahore, Punjab to Sardar Ranjit Singh of Sukerchakia Misl and his second wife Datar Kaur Nakai, lovingly called Nakain by his father and popularly known as Mai Nakain or Maharani Nakain. His mother was the daughter of Ran Singh Nakai, third ruler of the Nakai Misl.

A horoscope was commissioned for newborn prince, as was customary among the nobility of the time. Horoscopes were regarded as valuable indicators of the character and destiny of a future ruler. Astrologers suggested the prince be named according to the martial tradition of his family.

The prince was named by his father "Kharak" (ਖੜਕ) which means 'Wielder of the Sword' he was named after the unconquerable warrior mentioned in Dasam Granth. According to Gyani Sher Singh, Ranjit Singh knew the entire Dasam Granth by heart.

Ranjit Singh believed the birth of his son to be auspicious and his happiness was so great that Lahore was en fete. A full forty days were spent in alms giving, thanksgiving and celebration.

Sohan Lal Suri, the court biographer of the Sukerchakia royal family in his magnum opus, Umdat-ut-Tawarikh mentions the baby prince's arrival as a blessing to the local population and how everyone rejoiced.

"There was general pleasure and merry-making. The dust of distress and suffering was removed from the minds of the people. The persons who had been blinded with adversity procured the kohl of sight on account of abundant charities and alms. The oppressed ones derived great pleasure."

It was his birth that persuaded Ranjit Singh to proclaim himself the Maharaja of Punjab.

To celebrate his birth, his mother, Datar Kaur, asked her husband, Maharaja Ranjit Singh, to rebuild Gurdwara Janam Asthan of Guru Ram Das in the Chuna Mandi Bazaar at the birthplace of Guru Ram Das Ji. She felt that the ancestral home of Guru Sahib was too small, so Ranjit Singh purchased the surrounding buildings from the Qazis and had the gurdwara constructed in the architectural style of Sri Harmandir Sahib.

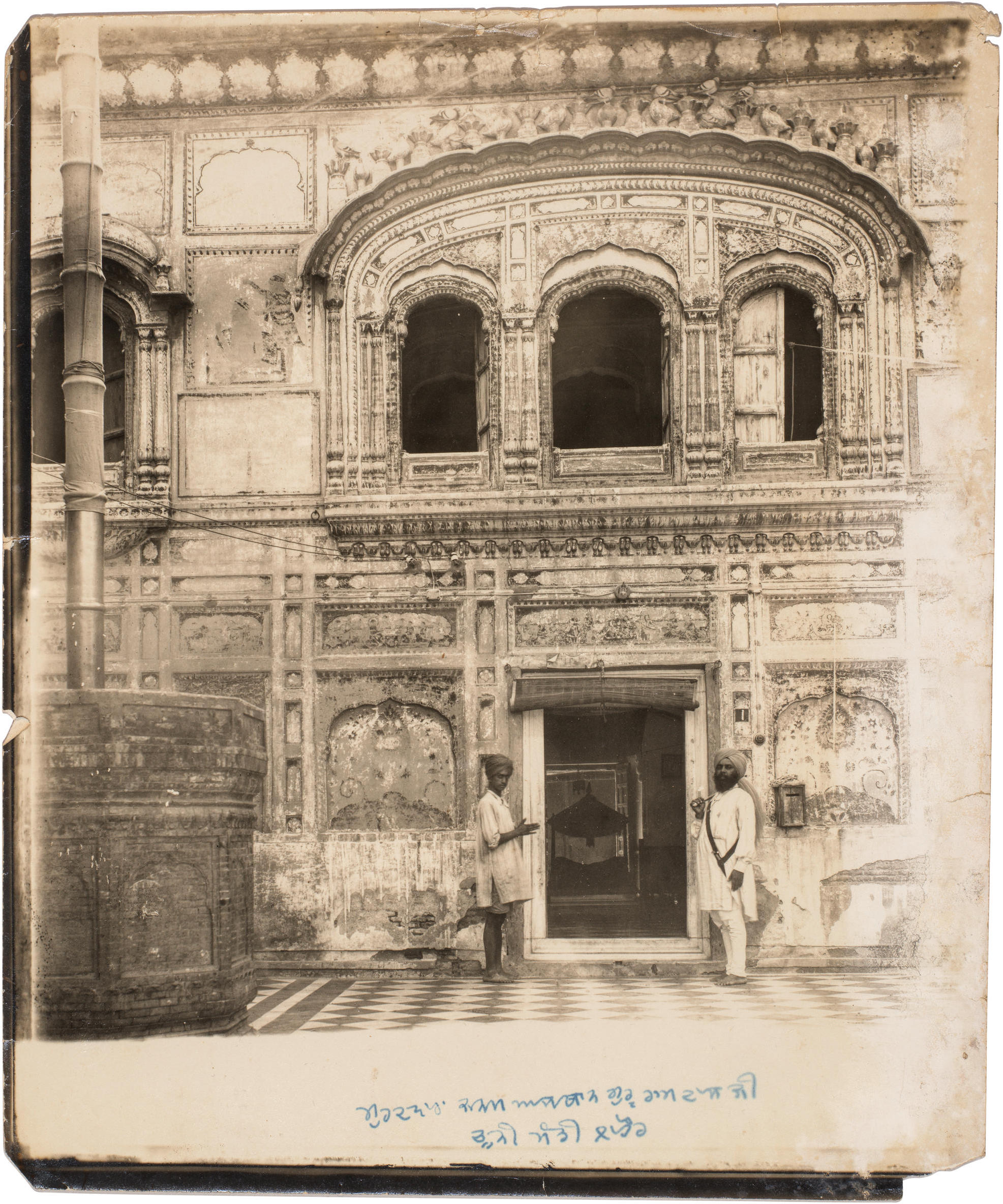
Photograph of Gurdwara Janam Asthan Guru Ram Das taken by Kahn Singh Nabha in the 1920s and published in the Mahan Kosh (1930)

The following year, adorned with Tilaka, he was paraded through the streets of Lahore as Punjab's prince.

In 1816, in a formal ceremony, Kharak Singh was appointed Yuvraj Shri Tikka Kanwar by his father.

== Early military campaigns and alliances ==
Kharak Singh was brought up in his family's martial tradition and assigned to a variety of military expeditions. While barely six years old, he was given the command of an expedition to conquer Sheikhupura the prince's mother then was gifted Sheikhupura Fort by his father.

In 1811, at the age of ten, the precocious Kharak Singh reportedly asked his father for control over the estates of the Nakai Misl—his mother’s kingdom—promising that he would render a far greater tribute than his cousin, Kahan Singh Nakai. His request was granted. Despite the revered Baba Sahib Singh Bedi's support for the Nakais the Nakai estates were obvertaken by Kharak Singh claiming he is "the grandson of the Nakais" while Kahan Singh Nakai was allowed to retain Baherwal with a jagir worth Rs. 20,000.

At a young age, he was engaged to Chand Kaur, the daughter of Jaimal Singh Kanhaiya of the Kanhaiya Misl, a match arranged by his father to ensure that the Kanhaiyas could not directly oppose the Sukerchakia heir-apparent. Following his marriage in 1812, he was placed in charge of the Kanhaiya estates. That same year, he was deputed—along with Dewan Mokham Chand and his tutor, Ram Singh—to punish the recalcitrant chiefs of Bhimber and Rajouri. Later in 1812, Kharak Singh received the principality of Jammu as his jagir. The campaign secured Sikh authority in the strategic footholds of the Kashmir region and Kharak Singh was praised for his administrative skills.

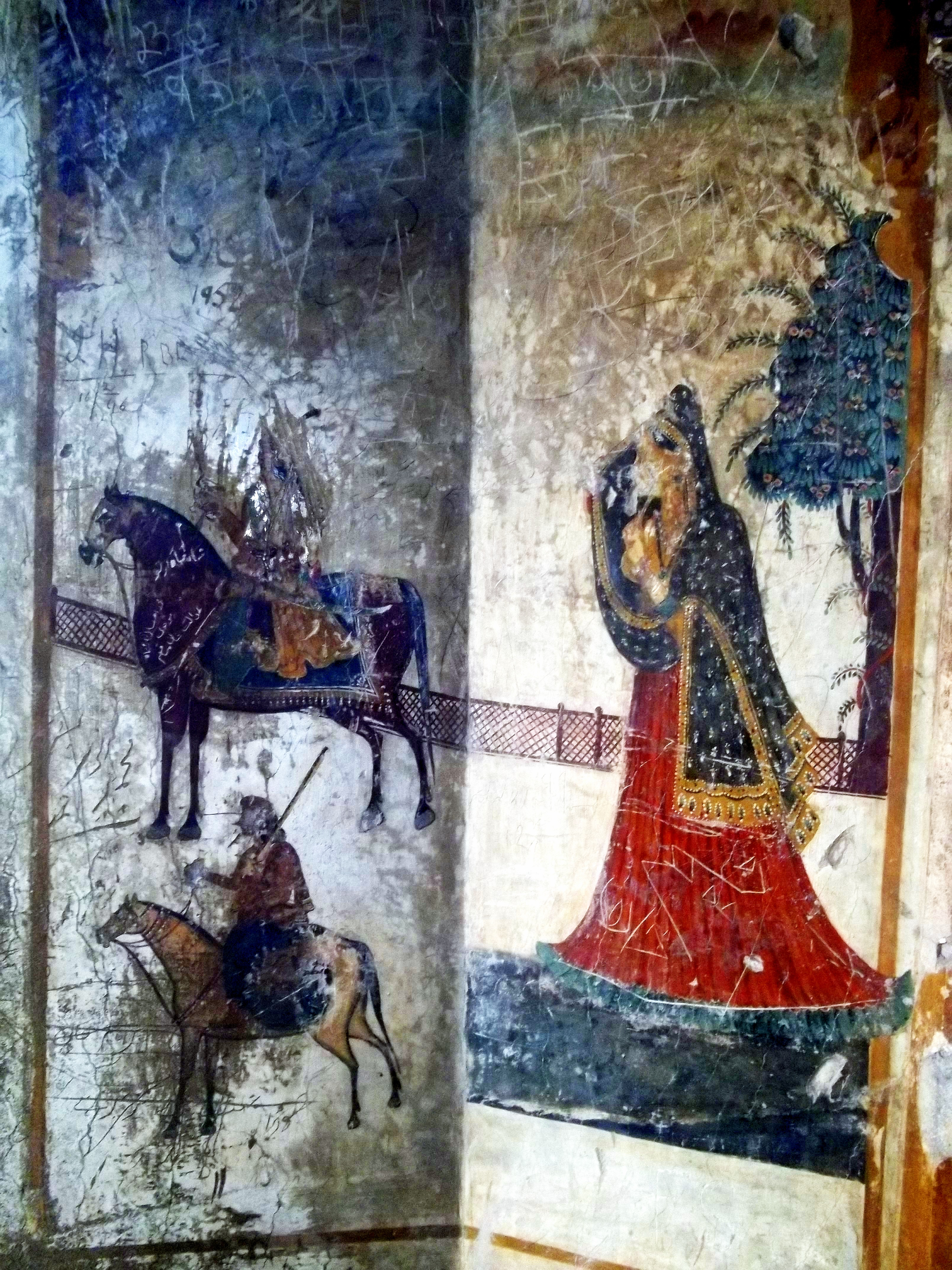
Kunwar Kharak Singh rides his horse as his mother, Maharani Datar Kaur, looks on.

Maharani Datar Kaur had a deep influence on her son and paid great attention to her son's education, as a result Kharak Singh mastered several languages and developed interests in cosmic sciences from an early age. Like his parents, Kharak Singh was deeply religious since childhood. He was a devout Sikh and admired for his piety and simplicity.

Kharak Singh shared a close relationship with his parents, particularly with his mother.

He cared for her deeply and was devoted to her throughout his life. Upon her death at Sheikhupura on June 20, 1838, he is recorded by Suri as having been inconsolable. He mourned for twenty-one days, attended no public meetings, and was unable to eat properly. Ranjit Singh even remarked to his son that he had lost a great deal of weight. His consort, Yuvrani Chand Kaur, personally supervised the distribution of alms in commemoration of her mother-in-law.

== Administration as the crown prince ==
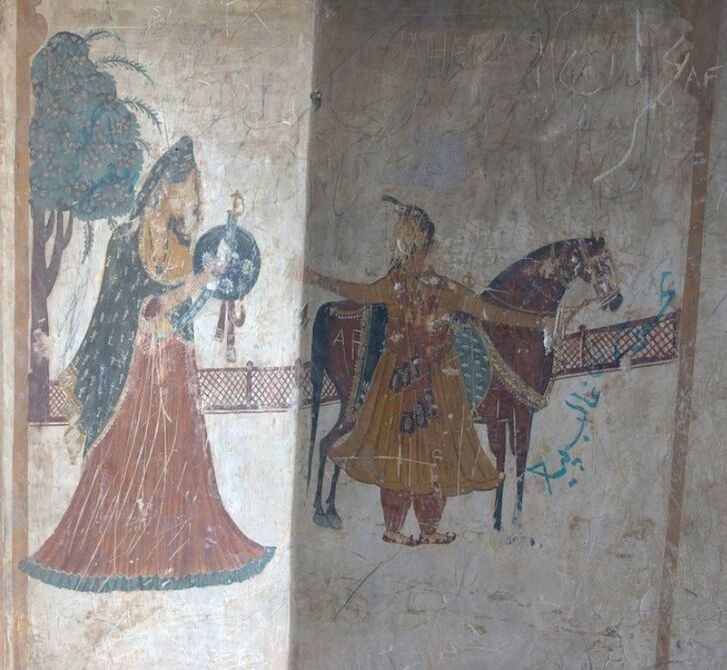
Fresco of Maharani Datar Kaur martially training her son, Kharak Singh

Since birth, Kharak Singh was the designated heir of his father. In 1816, at the age of 14, Maharaja Ranjit Singh officially anointed him as heir apparent, coronating him Yuvraj Shri Tikka Kanwar (crown prince). Kharak Singh was a popular and well-regarded crown prince.

The same year, his mother, Mai Nakain took over his training for 18 months and even accompanied him to his expedition to Multan.

He was invested with the command of Siege of Multan (1818). During the battle the queen herself oversaw the steady supply of grain, horses, and ammunition being sent to Kot Kamalia, a town equally distanced between Multan and Lahore. In 1818, together with Misr Diwan Chand he commanded an expedition against the Afghan ruler of Multan Nawab Muzaffar Khan, achieving a decisive victory at the Battle of Multan.

The crown prince showed military talent hence was given a battalion to command during the Battle of Shopian, which resulted in the annexation of Srinagar and Kashmir into the Sikh Empire. When the Sikh army entered the city of Srinagar after the battle, Prince Kharak Singh guaranteed the personal safety of every citizen and ensured the city was not plundered. The peaceful capture of Srinagar was important as Srinagar, besides having a large Shawl-making industry, was also the center of trade between Panjab, Tibet, Skardu, and Ladakh.

He commanded during similar campaigns undertaken by his father, Ranjit Singh for the conquest of Peshawar during the Battle of Nowshera and against the Mazaris of Shikarpur.

In 1839, Ranjit Singh awarded Kashmir to Kharak Singh, which was seen as a check on the ambitions of Gulab Singh Dogra.

== Reign ==
Maharaja Kharak Singh flanked by an attendant

On the death of his father Kharak Singh was proclaimed the Maharaja of Sarkar-I-Khalsa. His coronation took place on September 1, 1839 at Lahore Fort.

Kharak Singh was a patron of the arts, and commissioned a Sanskrit astronomy manuscript – the Sarvasiddhantattvacudamani.

Muhammad Naqi of Peshawar in his chronical "Tarikh-I-Punjab" wrote that Kharak Singh was devoted, benevolent, and gentle ruler

During his reign, which was no longer than one year and a few months, he gave great care to his kingdom, doing everything for the welfare of his people and the army. Everyone partook of his kindness according to his fortune for he acted as it is written, that all God's people should be treated with grace, and he shed no blood. The lease of life of this elect among princes drew to its appointed end, whatever may have been cause thereof. He placed the burden of his will upon the horse of death, exchanging the fleeting throne of trouble and anxiety for the wooden plank.

Though courageous and good in battle, Kharak was regarded as simple minded and believed to lack his father's shrewdness. He developed a close relationship with his tutor Chet Singh Bajwa after the death of his mother, who gained such an ascendancy over him as to render him a puppet. This relationship with Chet Singh created tensions with Prime Minister Dhian Singh.

The Austrian physician Johann Martin Honigberger, who was present at court, described his coronation as a dark day for the Punjab, and referred to the Maharaja as a blockhead who twice a day deprived himself of his senses and spent his whole time in a state of stupefaction. Historians challenge the popular oriental notion of Kharak Singh being considered "imbecile", as said by Alexander Burnes and Henry Montgomery Lawrence -who had never met Kharak Singh. Burns was the first to refer to Kharak Singh as imbecile but also mentions that Kharak was extremely kind hearted and noted that the prince was the master of an impressive military and good at the administrating and handling important strategic and governing duties assigned to him.

Claude Martin Wade, who was at the Lahore Durbar for 16 years disagreed as well, stating that Kharak Singh was a man with a "mild and humane disposition, who was "loved by his dependants". Wade suggests that Kharak Singh seemed to have a dismal reputation as he maintained a low profile. Dr. Priya Atwal and Sarbpreet Singh note that Kharak Singh was politically intelligent and well versed in multiple languages, the most educated prince of Maharaja Ranjit Singh who not only led military expeditions but also diplomatic events. Sarbjeet Singh states Kharak Singh along with his brothers was a victim of circumstance, something he labeled "A Shakespearean tragedy".

== Character ==

Kharak Singh closely resembled his father in features and appearance. Osborne describes him as the better looking version of his father. According to Eden he was tall, dark and handsome. Described as a man of remarkable kindness, humane and piety. Liked to keep a low profile and was introverted didn’t speak unless required. Kharak Singh was deeply religious and a devout Sikh.

== Death ==
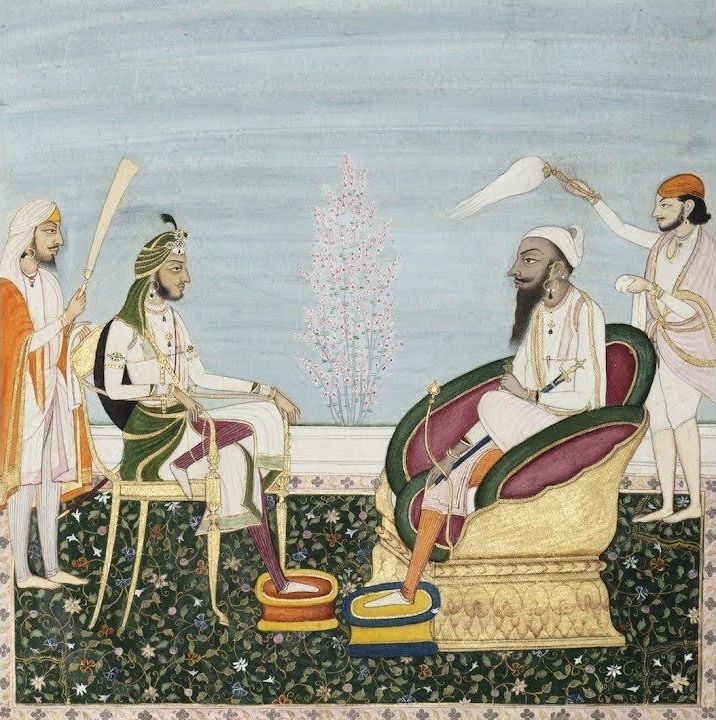
Painting of Maharaja Kharak Singh (right) with his son Nau Nihal Singh (left) flanked by attendants

Wazir Raja Dhian Singh is known to resent the influence of Chet Singh Bajwa, tutor of Kharak Singh on the emperor, as well as the court. It was rumored that both the Maharaja and Chet Singh were secretly planning to sell out the Punjab to the British, pay them six annas in every rupee of state revenue (37.5%) and, worse of all, disband the Sikh army. Misled by these fictitious tales, the court and Nau Nihal Singh became estranged from Kharak Singh.

Chet Singh was assassinated on 9 October 1839. Early that morning the conspirators entered the Maharaja's residence in the fort and assassinated Chet Singh in the presence of their royal master, who vainly implored them to spare the life of his friend.

In February 1840 Kharak Singh was officially deposed and imprisoned for supposed crimes. According to one account he was poisoned with white lead and mercury. Within six months he was bedridden, and eleven months after the poisoning he died on 5 November 1840 in Lahore. The official announcement blamed a sudden mysterious illness. Though never proven, most contemporaries believed Dhian Singh to be behind the poisoning. Dhian Singh also murdered one of Kharak Singh's wives, Rani Inder Kaur, by setting her on fire. Two of Kharak Singh's wives committed sati on his funeral pyre.

Dhian Singh had previously resisted attempts to allow Kharak training in statecraft, and on 8 October 1839 he instigated his removal from the throne with Nau Nihal Singh becoming de facto ruler.

== Family ==
=== Wives ===
According to Priya Atwal, the known wives of Kharak Singh were:

- Chand Kaur Kanhaiya of the Kanhaiya Misl(1802-1842), daughter of Jaimal Singh Kanhaiya was the first wife and queen consort of Kharak Singh. They were married in 1811 when they were both only 10 years old. In 1821 she gave birth to their only son Nau Nihal Singh. Umdat-ut-Tawarikh, the chronological account of the reign of the Sukerchakia family by their historiographer Sohan Lal Suri states that she was murdered on the orders of her brother-in-law, Sher Singh and Prime Minister Dhian Singh. The account further states that Sher Singh ordered for "medicines" to be given to widows of her son to terminate their pregnancies to avoid any future claimants to the throne resulting in the death of her grandchild and daughter-in-law, Sahib Kaur
- Khem Kaur Dhillon from Kalalwali, daughter of Jodh Singh Kalalwala was the second wife of Kharak Singh. They were married on 3 July 1815, given a pension worth Rs. 2,400. She had a jagir worth Rs. 12,000 that was confiscated as she colluded with the Multani rebels to overthrow the British her government in Punjab. Khem Kaur later adopted her cousin's son, Bhagwan Singh.
- Kishan Kaur Samra (also known as Subhrawali), daughter of a Jatt zamindar from Gurdaspur was the third wife of Kharak Singh and they were also married 1815. She was the only queen to live after the fall of the Sikh Empire in 1849, had an annual pension paid by the British Raj of RS 2324 and died in Lahore in 1876 while living at the Lahore Fort.
- Inder Kaur Bajwa was his last wife and they were married by proxy in a "chadar dalna" ceremony in 1816. She was a relative of Chet Singh Bajwa, Kharak Singh's tutor and close confidant.

=== Issues ===
The known male issues of Kharak Singh were:

- Nau Nihal Singh, born to Maharani Chand Kaur in 1821.

== Legacy ==
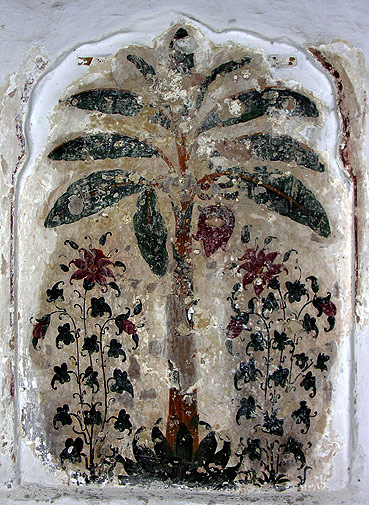
Fresco of a tree and flowers from Kharak Singh's haveli within the Lahore Fort

The samadhi of Kharak Singh is located in Lahore near the samadhis of his father, Ranjit Singh, and son, Nau Nihal Singh. A haveli known as Kharak Singh's Haveli, located in Shahi Qila, Lahore, is associated with him. In 2023, a treasure-trove of historical documents was discovered at the haveli.

== See also ==
- Gurdaspur District

Preceded by Ranjit Singh	Maharaja of the Sikh Empire; 27 June 1839 – 8 October 1839	Succeeded by Nau Nihal Singh
