= Sharakpur =

- Village
- Location in Punjab, India Sharakpur (India)
- Coordinates: 31.142488°N 75.4970273°E
- Country: India
- State: Punjab
- District: Jalandhar
- Tehsil: Nakodar

Government
  - Type: Panchayat raj
  - Body: Gram panchayat
- Elevation: 240 m (790 ft)

Population (2011)
  - Total: 1,587
- Sex ratio 825/762 ♂/♀

Languages
  - Official: Punjabi
- Time zone: UTC+5:30 (IST)
- ISO 3166 code: IN-PB
- Vehicle registration: PB- 08
- Website: jalandhar.nic.in

Sharakpur is a village in Nakodar in Jalandhar district of Punjab State, India. It is also called Sarpura. It is located 3 kilometres (1.9 mi) from Nakodar, 39 kilometres (24 mi) from Kapurthala, 24 kilometres (15 mi) from district headquarter Jalandhar and 156 kilometres (97 mi) from state capital Chandigarh. The village is administrated by a sarpanch who is an elected representative of village as per Panchayati raj (India).

== Transport ==
Nakodar railway station is the nearest train station. The village is 52 kilometres (32 mi) away from domestic airport in ADAMPUR JALANDHAR and the nearest international airport is located in Chandigarh also Sri Guru Ram Dass Jee International Airport is the second nearest airport which is 119 kilometres (74 mi) away in Amritsar.
