= Nakai Misl =

State of the Sikh confederacy

- 1748–1811
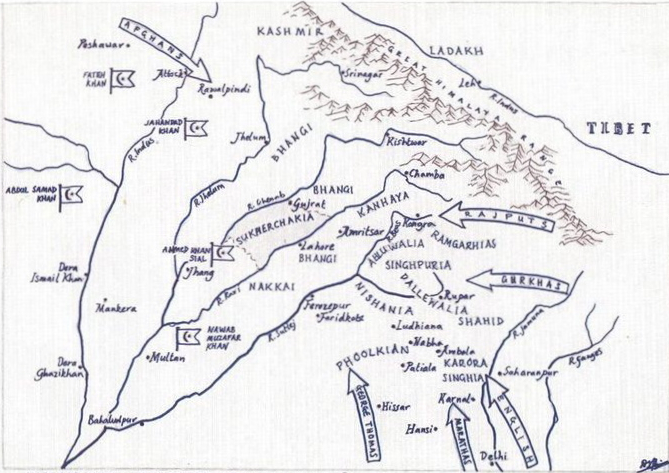
- Nakai Misl within the Sikh Confederacy
- Capital: Chunian
- Common language: Punjabi
- Religion: Sikhism (Official); Islam; Hinduism
- Sardar
  - 1748–1767: Heera Singh Sandhu (first)
  - 1807-1810/11: Kahan Singh Nakai (last)
- Historical era: Early modern period
  - Established: 1748
  - Disestablished: 1811
Preceded by	Succeeded by
Mughal Empire	Sikh Empire
- Today part of: Pakistan

The Nakai Misl (Punjabi: ਨਕਈ ਮਿਸਲ (Gurmukhi), نکئی مثل (Shahmukhi)), founded by Sandhu Jats, was one of the 12 Sikh Misls (groupings with their distinct guerrilla militia) that later became part of the Sikh Empire. It held territory between the Ravi and Sutlej rivers southwest of Lahore in what became Pakistan. The misl fought against the Sials, the Pathans and the Kharals before it was incorporated into the Sikh Empire of the Sukerchakia Misl by Ranjit Singh. The misl was founded by Jats.

== History ==
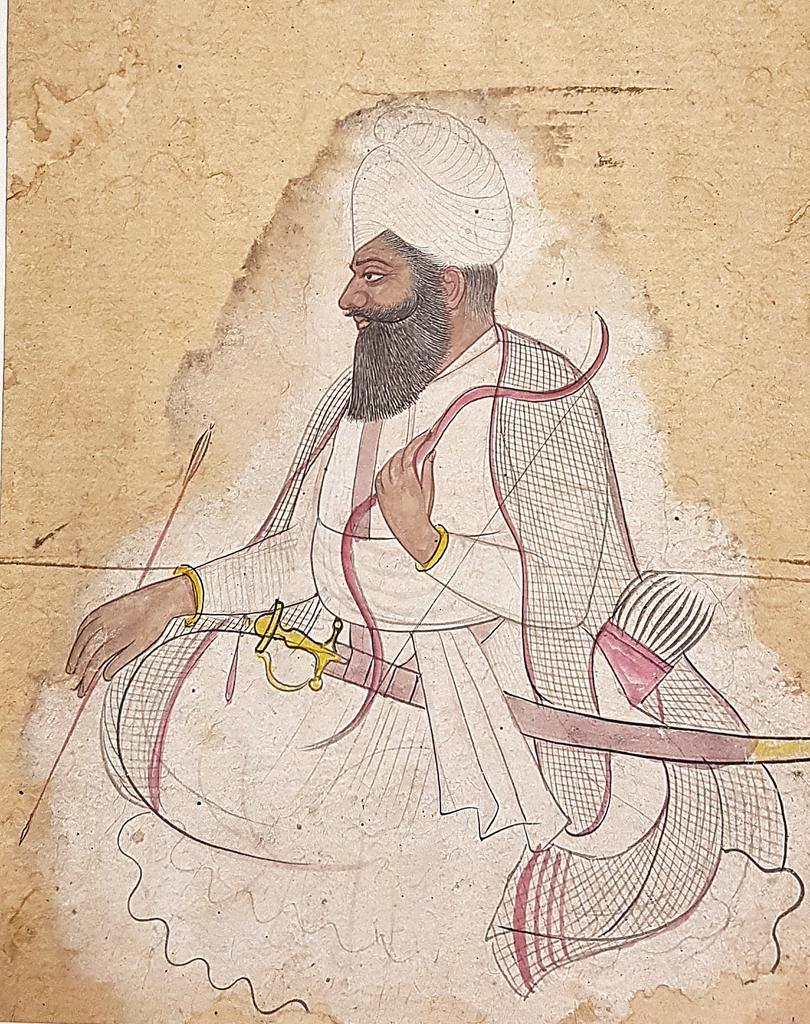
Wazir Singh Nakai, late 18th century

According to legend, in 1595 Guru Arjan Dev (1563–1606), the Fifth Sikh Guru, visited the village of Baherwal with some of his followers. The Guru was not received with hospitality, so he continued to the village of Jambar where he lay down on a charpai (cot) under a shady tree. Hem Raj, a Sandhu Jat, the Chaudhari or headman of Bahrwal, was absent when the Guru passed through his village. Hem Raj was ashamed of his town's inhospitality and went to Jambar and brought him back to his town. The Guru blessed Hem Raj and prophesied that they would one day rule. However, it took more than 100 years for the prophecy to materialize.

By 1748 when Mughal power in Punjab was on its decline, Sikhs were in ascendance. Sardar Heera Singh Sandhu (1706–1776) took possession of the lands surrounding Baherwal. The countryside of Kasur was located in Nakka country South of Majha Region. His misl took the name of the area they ruled. He took Amrit Sanchar (Sikh Baptism) in 1731. Nakka means border, or gateway, and Nakka country was located between the Ravi and Sutlej south of Lahore. He also took Chunian from the Afghans, but died near Pakpattan in a battle against Sujan Chisti - a devotee of the Shrine of Baba Farid. His companions brought his corpse to Baherwal where it was cremated. Hira Singh Sandhu's son, Dal Singh Sandhu, was a minor, so his nephew Nar Singh Sandhu, son of Natha Singh Sandhu, succeeded him as leader of the misl.

Nine months into his reign in 1768, Nar Singh was killed battling the Kharals at Kot Kumaliah. Nar Singh was issueless, and was succeeded by his brother Ran Singh. Ran Singh was ambitious and had expanded the misl's strength so that it became dominant among its neighbors. The misl reached its high point under Ran Singh. Ran Singh was a fierce warrior and the most powerful of the Nakai chiefs. He extended his rule to the talukas of Bucheke, Changa Manga, 69 km from Lahore, Chhichha, Devsal, Fatehpur, Jethupur, Kasur, Kharal fort of Kot Kamalia, Sharaqpur, Gugera pargana, 5 km to the west of the Ravi, and Shergarh, Zamburaks, and artillery. He could field 2,000 horsemen. Sardar Ran Singh was killed by one of the kharal tribe men. Ran Singh fought repeatedly against Kamar Singh, the ruler of Syedwala. Sometime before his death, Kamar Singh defeated and captured Syedwala. Sardar Ran Singh Nakai was killed by one of the Kharal tribesmen.

Ran Singh was succeeded by his eldest son, Bhagwan Singh Baghwan was unable to hold his territory against Wazir Singh, brother of Kamar Singh, and lost Syedwala to him. His mother Sardarni Karmo Kaur met with Wazir Singh to release some of her villages. Realizing they might lose all their territories Sardarni Karmo Kaur, in consultation with her people, betrothed her infant daughter, Raj Kaur Nakai to the four-year-old Ranjit Singh, son of Sukerchakia Chief Maha Singh, to gain a powerful ally. Wazir Singh was afraid that with Maha Singh, Bhagwan Singh would be able to defeat him, and so tried to break the relationship, but failed. Wazir Singh tried to mislead Karma Kaur, saying that the Nakai Sandhu Jatts were superior to the Sukerchakias, but Sardarni Karmo Kaur refused to break off the match and stated that all Sikhs are equal. Maha tried to bring peace, but Bhagwan and Wazir continued to engage in warfare, and Bhagwan was killed by Wazir. Dal Singh, the son of Hira Singh, subsequently killed Wazir in revenge but was himself killed later by one of Wazir's servants.

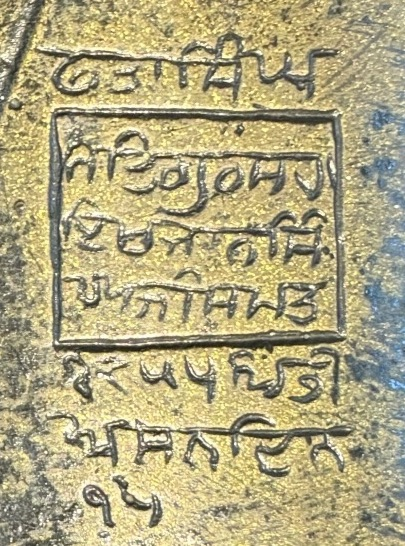
Gurmukhi inscription on a cannon of the Nakai Misl at Lahore Fort

Bhagwan had no children and was succeeded by his brother Gyan Singh as the head of the Nakai Misl in 1789. With the family's old enemy Wazir Singh killed by Dal Singh, the son of Heera Singh Sandhu, Gyan Singh had a relatively peaceful reign and consolidated his power. He married Sardarni Rai Kaur and had three children; a son Kahan Singh who succeeded him after his death in 1807, and two daughters named Bibi Rattan Kaur and Bibi Daya Kaur.

In 1798 Gyan Singh married his sister Raj Kaur to Ranjit Singh at his mothers behest, who became Ranjit's second but most favourite queen, whom he fondly called Mai Nakain. After the marriage, she was renamed Datar Kaur to avoid confusion with Ranjit's mother and aunt who were also both named 'Raj Kaur'. She received the name "Datar", meaning 'Giver', due to her gentleness and understanding nature. In 1801 she gave birth to Kharak Singh, the heir apparent of the Sikh Empire. She was granted a jagir by Ranjit Singh at Sheikhupura. She took control of the Sheikhupura Fort when her six-year-old son Kharak Singh conquered it. She gave birth to her second son Rattan Singh in 1805. The Sikh Khalsa Army was under her and her minor son Kharak Singh's command during the Battle of Multan (1818).

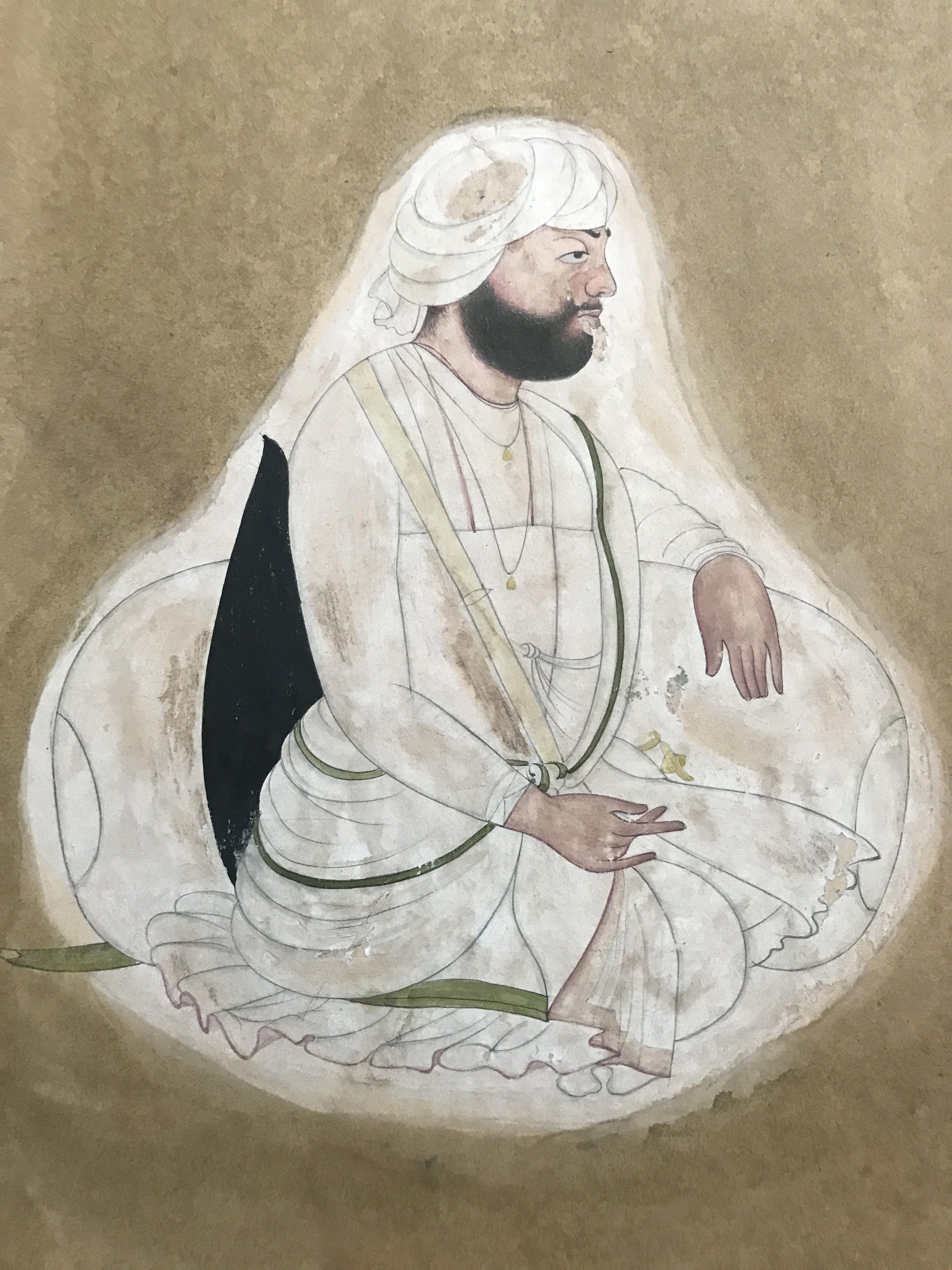
Painting of Bhagwan Singh Nakai, 4th ruler of the Nakai Misl

In 1807 Gyan Singh died and his son, Kahan Singh succeeded him. Before having his estate seized by Ranjit Singh in 1810, Sardar Kahan Singh conquered Pakpattan. After Ranjit Singh had declared himself the Maharaja of Punjab in 1801, he continued consolidating the majority of the Misls. The ambitious Maharaja eyed the Nakai territory, but spared it until Sardar Gyan Singh's death in 1807. Mohkam Chand conquered the fortresses of Chunia, Dipalpur, and Satghara. Sardar Kahan Singh came back from Multan to find his territories out of his control. Consequently, Ranjit Singh ordered the annexation of his holdings and granted Kahan Singh a Jagir at Baherwal, then valued at 15,000 Rupees. A Jagir at Nankot was also granted to Sardar Khazan Singh, a son of Sardar Ran Singh Nakai.

== Leaders ==
The leaders of the misl were:

- Heera Singh Sandhu (r. 1748–1767; d. 1767)
- Nar Singh Nakai (r. 1767–1775; d. 1775)
- Ran Singh Nakai (r. 1775–1784; d. 1784)
- Sardar Bhagwan Singh Nakai (r. 1784–1789; d. 1789)
- Sardar Gyan Singh Nakai (r. 1789–1807; d. 1807)
- Kahan Singh Nakai (r. 1807–1810; d. 1873).

== Territory ==
The misl originated from Barhwal in Multan. The Nakais controlled the area of northern Multan and the Lower Bari Doab. The Nakai Misl controlled areas along the Ravi river, between Multan and Kasur, including the settlements of Sharqpur, Chuniau, Gugera, Dipalpur, Satgarha, and Kot Kamalia.

== Descendants ==
Even after the Nakai Misl was incorporated into the Sikh empire, the Nakai Sardars continued to wield influence. The last Chief had his territory annexed by Maharaja Ranjit Singh, and he stayed in the village of Bahelwal afterward. After the annexation of Punjab by the British, he stayed neutral and loyal. As a result, he was appointed Jagirdar Magistrate in 1860, an office he held until his death. Even during the British rule in Punjab (1849–1947), the descendants of Nakai Sikh Misl were still Sikh Sardars.

Sardar Muhammed Arif Nakai, former Chief Minister of Punjab (Pakistan), was a direct descendant of the Nakai misldars. Lt. Gen. Jagdishwar Singh Nakai, another direct descendant, joined the British Indian Army when the Second World War broke out and served in the Burma Campaign. Lt. Gen. Nakai was a recipient of the Param Vishisht Seva Medal.

== Bibliography ==
- Bakshi, S.R.; Pathak, Rashmi, eds. (2007), Punjab Through the Ages, Sarup & Son, ISBN 978-81-7625-738-1
- Griffin, Lepel Henry (1865), The Panjab chiefs, historical and biographical notices, Lahore: Chronicle Press, ISBN 978-1-104-70911-2
- Roe, C.A.; Purser, W. E. (1878), REPORT ON THE REVISED LAND REVENUE SETTLEMENT OF THE MONTGOMERY DISTRICT, Lahore: Central Jail Press

http://www.panjabdigilib.org/webuser/searches/displayPage.jsp?ID=4554&page=1&CategoryID=1&Searched=W3GX&sbtsro=1&viewall=1 http://www.panjabdigilib.org/webuser/searches/displayPageContent.jsp?ID=4554&page=308&CategoryID=1&Searched=W3GX http://www.panjabdigilib.org/webuser/searches/displayPageContent.jsp?ID=7907&page=23&CategoryID=1&Searched=punjab+chiefs
