= Sandhu =

Jat clan in the Indian subcontinent

- Jat clan
- Ethnicity: Punjabi
- Location: Punjab
- Jathera: Kala Mehar
- Language: Punjabi
- Religion: Sikhism, Hinduism, Islam

The Sandhu or Sindhu clan (Punjabi: ਸੰਧੂ (Gurmukhi); سندھو (Shahmukhi)) is the second-largest clan of Jats in the Punjab, spanning both India and Pakistan. The Sandhus have had a significant impact on Sikh history, founding several Sikh states, including the Nakai Misl, Shaheedan Misl, and Kanhaiya Misl.

== List of notable people ==
Notable people with the surname, who may or may not be affiliated to the clan, include:

- Arif Nakai, 12th Chief Minister of Punjab, Pakistan, direct descendant of the Nakai misldars
- Aaqib Javed, Pakistani cricketer
- Avtar Singh Sandhu, better known as Pash, Indian poet
- Baba Deep Singh (1682–1757), Sikh martyr
- Banita Sandhu, British-Indian actress
- Bhai Bala (1466–1544), a companion of Guru Nanak
- Bhagat Singh (1907–1931), Indian revolutionary
- Captain Abhimanyu, former cabinet minister, Government of Haryana
- Deep Sandhu, Canadian politician
- Garry Sandhu (born 1984), Indian singer, lyricist, actor and owner of label Fresh Media Records
- Gurbaksh Singh Sandhu, former national boxing coach, India
- Gurinder Sandhu (born 1993), Indian-Australian professional cricketer
- Gurpreet Singh Sandhu (born 1992), Indian international goalkeeper
- Harnaaz Sandhu, Miss India 2021 and Miss Universe 2021
- Harpreet Sandhu (born 1979), Indian actor, director, writer, music director, editor, cinematographer and poet
- Harrdy Sandhu (born 1986), Indian singer and actor
- Heera Singh Sandhu (1706–1767), founder of the Nakai Misl
- Jaswinder Singh Sandhu, military secretary, Indian army
- Jinny Sandhu, British-Indian professional wrestler
- Jordan Sandhu, Indian singer and actor
- Kamaljeet Sandhu, Indian athlete
- Khalil Tahir Sandhu, Pakistani politician
- Manavjit Singh Sandhu (born 1976), Indian sport shooter and three-time Olympian
- Mehtab Kaur (1782–1813), Queen of the Sikh Empire
- Muhammad Afzal Sindhu, Pakistani politician, ex-Minister of State for Law and Justice and federal minister for railways
- Nandish Sandhu, Indian model and television actor
- Nashra Sandhu, Pakistani cricketer
- Nick Sandhu (born 1962), Indian field hockey player
- Nauman Zakaria, Lieutenant General in the Pakistan Army
- Paige Sandhu, British-Indian actress
- Peter Sandhu, Indo-Canadian politician and Member of the Legislative Assembly of Alberta
- Qadir Yar, court poet under Ranjit Singh
- Sahil Sandhu (born 1991), Indo-Canadian soccer player
- Taranjit Singh Sandhu, Indian retired diplomat
- Tayyab Rashid, Pakistani politician
- Tommy Sandhu (born 1976), British-Indian DJ, remixer, producer and television presenter
- Yasir Zafar Sindhu, Pakistani politician
