= Syedwala =

Pakistani town

- Location within Pakistan
- Coordinates: 31.1250°N 73.5050°E
- Country: Pakistan
- Province: Punjab
- District: Nankana Sahib District
- Established: 20 July 2013
- Elevation: 177 m (581 ft)
- Time zone: UTC+5 (PST)
  - Summer (DST): UTC+6 (PDT)
- Postal code: 039150
- Calling code: 056

Syedwala (Urdu: سید والا) is a historic town located in the Nankana Sahib District of Punjab (Pakistan). Recently designated as a new tehsil within the district, it has a total population of 102,185 according to the 2017 census. Syedwala is the most advanced city in District Nankana Sahib. It was recently planned after the 1990s due to flooding in the old Syedwala. The new Syedwala is modern and beautifully organized into blocks.

== Geography ==
The town lies on the banks of the Ravi River in Nankana Sahib, and connects the Faisalabad District, Sheikhupura District, and Okara District. The city is situated 27 kilometres (17 mi) from Jaranwala. A bridge spans the Ravi River there.

== History ==
Sher Shah Suri laid the foundation of Syedwala while he was in power. Suri was interested in building new cities, roads and buildings according to military requirements. When his Army passed by Syedwala, he recognized the area as a hub point for Punjab. The Ravi River's presence encourage him to build a city there. Syedwala old name is nanak chand Immigrants were drawn to the city due to its safety, cleanliness, and the fact that it was directly governed by Suri. Syedwala became a home for trade and art throughout the region.

In 1661, when Mughal Ruler Muhi-ud-Din Muhammad Aurangzeb was the ruler of the sub-continent, a great flood destroyed the city. A new Syedwala was then constructed 3 miles away. Syedwala quickly excelled again in the fields of art and culture and became a trading hub. In 1804, Maharaja Ranjeet Singh took over Syedwala. Until the rule of the British Empire, Syedwala remained in the hands of Sikhs.

=== Timeline ===
- From 1813 to 1849, Syedwala remained a part of Jhang Province.
- 1849: became a part of the District Pakpattan.
- 1855: merged in Gogera Tehsil.
- 1864: became a part of Montgomery Sahiwal.
- 1881: was class 3 town Municipal Committee. At that time Sheikhupura was a small village.
- 1913: merged into District Lyallpur (Faisalabad) including its 137 villages.
- 1922: merged both into District Sheikhupura and Nankana Sahib simultaneously.
- 2005: became part of Nankana Sahib District

== Flood ==
This city was destroyed by flood in three stages. The first flood in 1920 ruined one-third of the city. The second flood demolished half of the city in 1940. The whole city vanished in the flood in 1957-1958. At that time, the population was 3156.

On 9 October 1987, a flood once more threatened to destroy New Syedwala, but the new city was 2 kilometres (1.2 mi) away from the river. Although the city remained safe, the flood produced a great panic and disturbance among the peoples of New Syedwala.

== Industries ==
- Rice factories (07)
- Ice factories (03)
- Poultry farms (15)
- Record Label Haider Prast

== Transportation ==
Syedwala is 11 Km from Jaranwala-interchange on Exit-4 M-3 motorway (Pakistan).
