= Sikh invasion of Jammu =

Sikh Invasion of Jammu
- Part of the internal conflicts of the Sikh Empire
| Date | February to April 1845 |
| Location | Jasrota, Jammu, Tawi River, Zillu tank, Akhnur, and neighbouring hill forts |
| Result | Lahore Darbar victory |

Belligerents
| Lahore Darbar; Sikh Khalsa Army | Dogra Dynasty |

Commanders and leaders
| Lal Singh; Sham Singh Attariwala; Ranjodh Singh Majithia; Chattar Singh Attariwala; Mewa Singh Majithia | Gulab Singh (surrendered); Wazir Ratnu (WIA); Mian Jawahir Singh (POW) |

Strength
| About 12,000 in three brigades | A body of about 2,000 men near Jasrota; About 3,000 hill troops |

Casualties and losses
- Villages around Jasrota and Jammu were plundered or burned, and civilians were seized during the campaign

The Sikh Invasion of Jammu in 1845 or Invasion of Jammu by Lahore armies was a military and political confrontation between the Lahore Darbar and Gulab Singh of Jammu during the final years of the Sikh Empire. It followed Gulab Singh's surrender of Jasrota after he had removed most of its treasure, leaving the Lahore Darbar with only about two and a quarter lakhs of rupees. The Lahore Darbar treated the act as a breach of faith, declared him an enemy, and ordered troops toward Jammu. Gulab Singh responded by delaying negotiations, bribing influential figures, stirring divisions within the army, and preparing to resist if attacked.

During the negotiations, Gulab Singh dealt separately with Sikh commanders, army panchayats, individual soldiers, and Peshaura Singh. He presented himself as a loyal servant wronged by the Lahore Darbar, while his agents offered money, gifts, and promises to sections of the army. Lal Singh's envoys and the army panchayats both entered talks with him, but the negotiations became a means of delay. A deputation leaving Jammu with four lakhs of rupees was then attacked, the money was seized, and Fateh Singh Mann and Wazir Bachna were killed.

The Khalsa army then advanced on Jammu. Fighting took place near the Tawi, the Zillu tank, and the approaches to the town, while other Sikh forces captured surrounding forts and pressed Gulab Singh from several directions. The campaign exposed both Gulab Singh's weakness and the disorder within the Khalsa army, whose commanders and panchayats were divided over whether to continue the attack or accept terms. Gulab Singh used those divisions to avoid a final assault and renew negotiations.

Gulab Singh eventually appeared before the Sikh chiefs as a suppliant and accepted a settlement. He retained his own possessions and those of Dhian Singh, while the possessions of Hira Singh and half of those of Suchet Singh were to revert to the Maharaja. He also agreed to pay thirty five lakhs of rupees. He was later brought to Lahore as a prisoner, but used his wealth and factional support in the army to secure release. He was fined sixty eight lakhs of rupees, and afterward withdrew to Jammu, where he resumed negotiations with the British.

== Background ==
By early 1845, relations between the Lahore Darbar and Gulab Singh had deteriorated severely following the fall of his nephew, Raja Hira Singh, who had served as wazir (prime minister) of the Sikh Empire since 15 September 1843. On 21 December 1844, Hira Singh fled Lahore with Gulab Singh's eldest son and approximately one thousand troops, intending to reach Jammu, but his enemies in the Khalsa army pursued and assassinated him before he arrived. The heads of the Dogra chiefs were exhibited in chains and their bodies left to dogs, an act that alarmed Gulab Singh and made a Khalsa military move against him appear imminent.

Prior to this, Gulab Singh had entered into a treaty with the Lahore Darbar in January 1845 by which he agreed to pay a sum of money and surrender certain territories. Neither party, however, intended to honour the agreement fully, both awaiting a more favourable opportunity. Gulab Singh surrendered the fort of Jasrota in partial compliance but only after removing its riches. The Lahore Darbar had received daily accounts of the treasure's removal to Jammu, Riasi, and the higher hills before the surrender and accordingly, when Jasrota was found to contain only about two and a quarter lakhs of rupees, the anger of the government was proportionate to the expectations that had been raised by news of the cession. Reproaches and threats were directed at Gulab Singh and his agents. The provincial governors were instructed to treat him as an enemy, and Raja Rahim-ulla-Khan of Rajauri, then at Lahore, was encouraged to intensify the insurrection in the hill dependencies through his son, territory that the treaty had recently guaranteed to Mian Jowaher Singh.

Gulab Singh's response was to point to the Darbar's own bad faith in that latter instance while professing willingness to fulfil his treaty obligations if given assurance that doing so would not lead to his ruin. At the same time, he redoubled his efforts at intrigue and bribery to embarrass the Lahore Darbar and delay any actual collision with Sikh troops. He obtained, through a heavy present to the slave Mangla, the temporary silence of Rani Jindan, who was ordinarily hostile to him.

=== Decision to invade ===
The other senior figures of the Lahore government, in particular Sardar Jowaher Singh and Raja Lal Singh, were encouraged to act against Gulab Singh by a combination of factors, first being the successes of the sons of Raja Rahim-ulla-Khan, the defection of Gulab Singh's troops in Jasrota and elsewhere, and the known disposition of those troops to seek the higher pay and privileges available in the Khalsa army. After considerable dispute and discussion, a plan of operations was settled upon, and three brigades with artillery totalling approximately 12,000 men were ordered towards Jammu. The force was commanded by General Mewa Singh Majithia, General Lal Singh Moranwala, and General Sant Singh, son of the former governor of Kashmir.

Sardar Sham Singh Attariwala had from the outset attempted to restrain the Sikh troops from excesses and warned the Lahore Darbar of the likely consequences. His warnings went unheeded. The Lahore Darbar had compounded the disorder by appealing to the army against the British, and by each faction of the government separately attempting to secure the loyalty of the soldiery against its rivals. The troops at Jasrota had become ungovernable. Just as the order of march against Jammu was settled, Sham Singh reported to the Lahore Darbar that the soldiery, having taken a quarter of the Jasrota treasure for themselves, had systematically plundered the surrounding country, burning many villages, committing extensive atrocities, and seizing more than 800 women of every social rank, carrying many of them back to their homes in the plains.

=== Gulab Singh's preparations ===
Finding that the Lahore Darbar could not be deterred from invasion, Gulab Singh concentrated his army and recalled his troops from Kashmir. Defections had shaken his confidence in those around him: two regiments, one formerly of Hira Singh's and one of Suchet Singh's, had gone over to the Sikhs at Jasrota almost entirely. To counter the attraction of Lahore's higher wages, he was said to have announced an increase in his troops pay to ten rupees a man, though this was never actually paid out.

He renewed his efforts to disrupt revenue collection in the surrounding country and thereby accelerate the financial crisis at Lahore. His initial emissaries had limited success because they offered only promises where the forces sent under the late Hira Singh were on the spot with arms and capable leaders and a later dispatch of money was expected to achieve greater results. He also moved to reduce the insurrection in his nephew's territory and to punish the Raja of Rajauri. Every Sikh soldier in his service was honourably dismissed and the roads from the plains were placed under guard to prevent intercourse without his sanction.

At Lahore and in the army, Gulab Singh tried to strengthen his position by spreading reports of his preparations. He warned that, if forced to defend himself, he would do so as a Rajput. Uncertainty grew when reports arrived that the Barakzai chiefs in Lahore and Kabul were sending away their women, a common sign of preparations for revolt, while messengers continued to pass between Muhammad Akbar Khan and Gulab Singh.

His main efforts, however, were directed toward Peshaura Singh, individual soldiers, and members of the Darbar. Gulab Singh's supporters argued that, after the conduct of the Rani and her brother, he could not immediately hand over his nephew's treasure. They said he was willing, if given security, to pay fifty lakhs of rupees within six months to help the Lahore Darbar maintain the army, and to surrender the remaining treasure later. He also warned that, if attacked, he would send his treasure into the mountains and fight to the last and even if the Darbar's troops won, they would suffer heavily and gain little.

These reports had an immediate effect on the Khalsa army. After the leading division had advanced about twenty miles, it halted. Some commanders pleaded illness, while others refused to move on, saying that the conditions were too dangerous. The soldiers first refused to advance until they received the promised gold necklaces. After the necklaces were distributed, they again refused to proceed unless the Lahore Darbar adopted a clearer policy toward Gulab Singh, who was now being described as an old and faithful servant of the state. Some demanded the appointment of a commander-in-chief, while others insisted that the Maharaja and the Lahore Darbar should lead the army in person.

=== Raja Lal Singh assumes command ===
At Lahore, the Darbar remained divided and uncertain. Public business had largely passed into the hands of Mangla, a court slave, who had received formal titles in a document prepared by Faqir Azizuddin, Faqir Nuruddin, and Diwan Dina Nath. In that document, the Rani Jindan was styled Mallika Mookaddusa, in imitation of the Queen of England. The Rani wanted Sardar Jowaher Singh to lead the army while keeping Raja Lal Singh at Lahore. Jowaher Singh refused to leave the capital and instead ordered Lal Singh to go to Jammu. Lal Singh also refused, and the dispute led to repeated quarrels in the Darbar.

After several days of argument, which nearly turned violent, Lal Singh agreed to take command. He did so only on the condition that he receive full authority to conduct the war or make peace, and that almost all the troops and principal chiefs at Lahore accompany him. Diwan Bhagat Ram, the chief mutsaddi of the army, was also ordered to join him. Lal Singh left Lahore on 8 February 1845 with about 5,776 men of all arms and several chiefs. Sardar Sham Singh Attariwala and his associates at Jasrota were instructed to come under his command.

By then, discipline among the regular troops at Jasrota had broken down. They had expelled their general, Rattan Singh Mann, and refused to serve under him despite appeals from the Darbar and Sham Singh. They continued to attack the local population, seizing women and boys, sending them to the plains, and burning villages. The hill population began moving its property to higher ground and waited for an opportunity to rise against the troops.

== Negotiations at Jammu ==
Over the next two weeks, Lal Singh and the force from Lahore gradually approached Jammu, while Sham Singh advanced more slowly through the hills of Jasrota. The movement was delayed by heavy rain and by distrust between the troops and their commanders. Gulab Singh encouraged this distrust, since delay worked in his favour. By this stage, Lal Singh and the senior chiefs were already inclined to negotiate rather than fight, especially because of the condition of the army.

Soon after joining the army, Lal Singh sent Fatteh Singh Mann and others to Jammu to begin negotiations. Gulab Singh received the envoys with ceremony and kept them occupied for several days, alternating between professions of submission and suggestions of resistance. At the same time, the troops began separate negotiations of their own. Several hundred representatives of the army panchayats went to Jammu, where they were received with deference and hospitality. After several days, however, no agreement had been reached. The panchayats offered Gulab Singh the office of wazir, but he refused and instead recommended Peshaura Singh, to whom he had given five lakhs of rupees. Peshaura Singh was then holding court daily at Sialkot and receiving deputations from the army.

These developments weakened Lal Singh and the other chiefs. They were being ignored by the army they claimed to command and learned of the talks only through news-writers. Since their own position depended on the outcome, each chief began private negotiations with both Gulab Singh and Peshaura Singh.

The situation at Jammu was matched by uncertainty at Lahore. The Lahore Darbar received daily reports of disturbances in the Derajat and elsewhere, as well as alarms from Peshawar. Court astrologers added to the anxiety, and for two days Jowaher Singh took the Maharaja out of Lahore on the pretext of hunting.

=== Attack on the Sikh deputation ===
The deputies sent by Lal Singh returned from Jammu with Gulab Singh's reply. He said that he was willing to accept the treaty recently concluded by his agents at Lahore, and to provide increased revenue and a nazarana, if the jagirs and farms of Rajas Dhian Singh and Hira Singh were transferred to him. He denied that the sums claimed by the Lahore Darbar were correct, but offered to pay whatever could be proved to be due. Since the claims depended on the testimony of Hira Singh's confidential servants, Bachna Wazir, Hira Nand, the keeper of the Toshakhana, and Ganpat Rai Munshi, Gulab Singh asked that they be brought to Jammu to decide the matter. The Lahore Darbar agreed.

The deputation that returned to Jammu included Fateh Singh Mann, Bawa Mian Singh, Munshi Rattan Chand Duggal, Sher Singh Attariwala, Bachna Wazir, Hira Nand, and Ganpat Rai. Rattan Chand's first reports to Lahore suggested that an agreement would soon be reached, which gave Gulab Singh more time. After sharp exchanges between Gulab Singh and Wazir Bachna, Gulab Singh paid the deputation four lakhs of rupees on 28 February 1845 as a sign of good faith. Later the same day, as the deputation left Jammu for the Sikh army with the money, it was attacked and the treasure was seized. Fatteh Singh Mann and Wazir Bachna were killed. They were on the same elephant as Ganpat Rai, and all three were shot by Gulab Singh's soldiers as they passed through an opening in a thorn hedge recently placed around Jammu. Ganpat Rai was seriously wounded, as was Munshi Rattan Chand Duggal.

Sources disagree on the precise nature of Gulab Singh's responsibility for the attack. Historian Barkat Rai Chopra presents him as expressing the deepest sorrow and protesting to the Panchayats that the incident was contrary to his wishes and orders. While the account by Professor Bal is more explicit as it states that Gulab Singh, angered by the rudeness of Fateh Singh Mann and Bachna during negotiations and by their open threats against him in front of his own courtiers, deliberately ordered their killing after bidding them farewell. In both accounts Gulab Singh returned Ganpat Rai to the Sikh force while retaining Bawa Mian Singh, Sher Singh Attariwala, and Rattan Chand Duggal in Jammu, evidently as hostages and potential negotiators.

== Military campaigns ==
News of the attack reached Sham Singh Attariwala, who immediately ordered Ranjodh Singh to disperse a body of approximately 2,000 of Gulab Singh's men on the borders of Jasrota and then advance on Jammu through the hills with extreme caution. On 1 March 1845, Sham Singh himself moved to within six miles of Jammu, while Lal Singh, though originally closer, had advanced only to within about twelve miles.

The deaths of Fatteh Singh Mann and his companions were widely mourned by the Lahore Darbar and the chiefs at Lahore, and for a moment appeared to unite the factions in a more vigorous prosecution of the war. The troops at Lahore pressed for an immediate advance on Jammu, and every effort was made to forward entrenching tools, ammunition, and other stores to the army. The governor of Kashmir was ordered to dispatch his son, Sheikh Immamud-din, against Jammu through the hills.

=== Battle at the Tawi and Zillu tank ===
Gulab Singh, finding that his protestations of innocence and offers to negotiate were rejected, took the initiative. He caused one Sikh general who had approached Jammu to reconnoitre to be vigorously attacked, and only the arrival of powerful reinforcements drove the hillmen back. A sustained cannonade and musketry exchange followed on both sides, producing little decisive result. When the Sikhs, suffering from want of water, launched a general attack and fought for eight hours, they drove Gulab Singh's men from the Tawi river, the Zillu tank, and the outer jungle. Rather than pressing on to invest the small fort commanding the approach to Jammu and secure the river banks, however, the Sikh commanders withdrew to their camp, leaving the scattered troops to follow at their leisure. The soldiers thereafter spread through the surrounding country committing extensive atrocities.

The hillmen regained confidence and re-established their posts. Two days later, they attacked Sham Singh's camp by night, driving the men before them and capturing two guns. Sham Singh Attariwala dismounted from his elephant, personally led a rally, recovered the guns, and drove the attackers beyond their original position.

=== Ranjodh Singh Majithia's campaign ===
While the regular army stalled, the irregular wing of the Khalsa army had greater success. Ramgarh surrendered to it, and though Devigarh was defended by Arjun Mal, it ultimately fell. At Uttambhai, an attempt was made to block the advance, but it was not wholly successful. On the west, Mangal Singh captured the forts of Munawar and Akhnur, while Ranjodh Singh Majithia defeated Wazir Ratnu in a second engagement and dispersed his force, leaving the road by the eastern hills open to Jammu. Orders from Lahore were sent to prosecute hostilities vigorously. The combined successes of the regular and irregular wings effectively encircled Jammu.

=== Gulab Singh's submission ===
Gulab Singh's choices were either to fight his way out and withdraw to the interior or to negotiate. He chose negotiation. Chiefs in the Sikh command who favoured him persuaded the troops to fall back toward Sialkot and send Sultan Muhammad Khan and Chattar Singh to discuss terms. They proposed a meeting between Gulab Singh and Lal Singh, and promised to persuade the Khalsa army to return to Lahore if Mian Jawahir Singh was first surrendered. Gulab Singh handed over Jawahir Singh after receiving assurances that he would be treated honourably as the son of his brother and a former wazir of the Sikh Empire. The promise was not kept. Once Mian Jawahir Singh was in the army's hands, he was imprisoned.

On 15 March 1845, Gulab Singh and the Sikh leaders met between the two armies in a garden at the Zillu tank. Gulab Singh came before the chiefs with folded hands and a sheet around his neck as a suppliant. He expressed sorrow for his conduct and left the decision of punishment or forgiveness to them. The chiefs replied that he had committed no offence. After exchanging presents and speaking as friends for more than an hour, the two sides separated.

The peace terms allowed Gulab Singh to retain his former possessions and the territories of the late Dhian Singh. The possessions of Hira Singh and half of those of Suchet Singh were to revert to the Maharaja. Gulab Singh was also to pay thirty five lakhs of rupees for the nazarana of Dhian Singh's territory, three years of tribute and revenue arrears, and the property of Hira Singh and Pandit Jalla. Five lakhs were to be paid at once, and the rest in monthly instalments of five lakhs. He was also to visit the Sikh leaders once the army began its march back toward Lahore.

Writer Khushwant Singh gives the same timeline. Gulab Singh first submitted without fighting and paid four lakhs of rupees, but the tribute was seized after an ambush on the returning army. When the army came back and defeated the Dogras in several engagements, Gulab Singh again capitulated, placed his sword and shield on the ground, and protested his loyalty. Gopal Singh also records the initial surrender, the ambush, the Sikh return, several Dogra defeats, and Gulab Singh's later submission.

== Aftermath at Lahore ==
The settlement with Gulab Singh alarmed Jowaher Singh, who had hoped that the army would remain occupied at Jammu and leave Lahore quieter. Jowaher Singh tried to undo the agreement by sending Baba Rattan Singh to Jammu with instructions to press Lal Singh to reject the treaty, seize Gulab Singh's hostages, and renew the attack. The hostages appealed to General Mewa Singh and the panchayats, who returned them safely to Jammu.

Gulab Singh's imprisonment did not end his influence. He and his supporters continued to win over troops, while his opponents quarrelled over how to deal with him. The panchayats rebuked the Lahore Darbar for acting without their sanction and ordered that he be presented to the Maharaja and Rani Jindan in the manner they prescribed.

On 22 April 1845, the troops ordered the Darbar to reconcile with Gulab Singh. He was escorted to court, received with honour, lightly rebuked by the Rani, and accepted the terms imposed on him. He was then taken back to his place of confinement with ceremony, the guards were removed, and he was declared free. He was fined sixty eight lakhs of rupees, but paid only twenty seven lakhs in cash. Afterward he withdrew to Jammu. Khushwant Singh and Gopal Singh state that he resumed negotiations with the British and offered his services in the event of war against the Sikhs.

== See also ==
- Gulab Singh
- Sikh Empire
- Jasrota campaign
- First Anglo-Sikh War

== Bibliography ==
- Bal, S. S. (1975). Proceedings — Punjab History Conference. Vol. 9. Patiala: Publication Bureau, Punjab University.
- Chopra, Barkat Rai (1969). Kingdom of the Punjab, 1839–45. Hoshiarpur: Vishveshvaranand Institute.
- Khushwant Singh (2004). A History of the Sikhs. Vol. 2 (2nd ed.). New Delhi: Oxford University Press. ISBN 9780195673098.
- Gopal Singh (1988). A History of the Sikh People, 1469–1988 (2nd ed.). New Delhi: World Book Centre. ISBN 8170231396.
- Virendra Kumar (1978). India under Lord Hardinge. New Delhi: Rajesh Publications.
- Charak, Sukh Dev Singh (1997). Historiography on Jammu. Jay Kay Book House.
- Charak, Sukh Dev Singh (1985). A Short History of Jammu Raj: From Earliest Times to 1846 A.D. Ajaya Prakashan.
