= Jasrota campaign =

1844–1845 military conflict, Sikh Empire

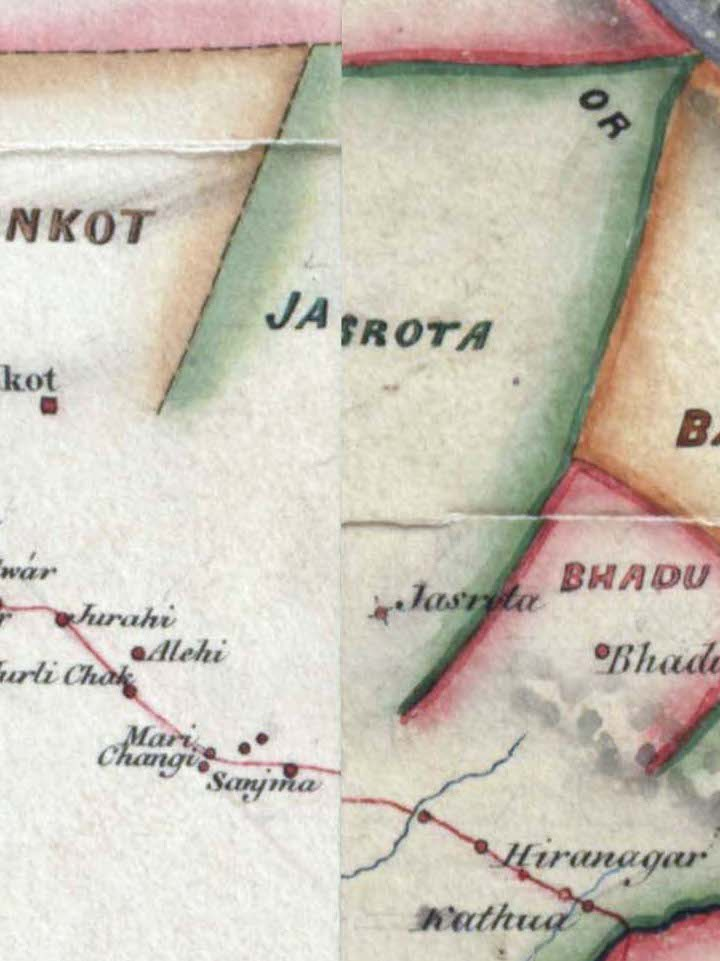
- Territory of Jasrota
Date	December 1844 – January 1845
Location	Jasrota and the surrounding Jammu hills
Result	Jasrota surrendered to the Khalsa Army
Territorial changes	Fort of Jasrota occupied by Sikhs

Belligerents
Sikh Empire	Dogra Dynasty; Jasrota

Commanders and leaders
Sham Singh Attariwala; General Rattan Singh Mann; Ranjodh Singh Majithia	Raja Gulab Singh; Mian Jawahir Singh (surrendered)

Strength
Ten battalions of infantry with cavalry and artillery 2,000 Sikh troops garrison	10,000 soldiers

Casualties and losses
Unknown	Heavy

The Jasrota campaign (1844–1845) or Sikh conquest of Jasrota was a military and political conflict within the Sikh Empire that took place between December 1844 and January 1845. It began after the events in Lahore on 21 December 1844, when the Lahore Darbar attempted to seize the property, treasury, and crown jewels of Raja Hira Singh at Jasrota. The dispute soon escalated into a confrontation with Raja Gulab Singh, the leading Dogra noble in the hills.

The Sikh forces moved toward Jasrota after disputes over pay delayed their departure. The operation was affected by unrest in the army, negotiations between Gulab Singh and the Darbar, local resistance around Jammu, and divisions within Gulab Singh's own family. Jasrota was surrendered to Sikh troops under General Rattan Singh Mann, and the news reached Lahore on 23 January 1845.

== Background ==
After the events at Lahore on 21 December 1844, when the Lahore Darbar attempted to seize the property, treasury, and crown jewels of Raja Hira Singh at Jasrota the Darbar considered how to deal with Raja Gulab Singh of Jammu. The unsettled condition of the government prevented a definite decision. One proposed settlement would have left Gulab Singh in possession of his own holdings, assigned Suchet Singh's property to Suchet Singh's widow, and confiscated Hira Singh's property. No arrangements were made for the possibility that Gulab Singh might reject these terms.

When Gulab Singh learned of the events at Lahore, he sent a detachment under Mian Jawahir Singh, the brother of Hira Singh, to remove the treasure and crown jewels kept at Jasrota. The Sikh garrison at Jasrota was attacked and defeated. The attack occurred during an incident involving the plundering of Hira Singh's wives while they were preparing for sati.

Rani Jindan ordered the confiscation of Hira Singh's property and sent Lala Rattan Chand and Babu Mian Singh to Gulab Singh. The demands required the surrender of Hira Singh's possessions held by Gulab Singh, payment of a fine of three crore rupees, and the handover of Mian Jawahir Singh, the second son of Dhian Singh. Gulab Singh did not accept the demands. He sent Jawahir Singh to Jasrota, where Hira Singh had earlier collected troops for an attack on Chamba, and began preparing for resistance.

Gulab Singh made approaches to the British before the Lahore army moved against him. He expected that British troop movements on the Sutlej frontier might divert the Sikh forces from an attack on Jammu. The British instead informed the Lahore Government that they would not interfere in the internal affairs of the Sikh Empire. The Lahore Government then ordered its troops to move against Jammu.

== Lahore mobilisation ==
The Darbar did not yet have reliable information about affairs in Jammu and Jasrota when a force was ordered to Jasrota to seize the treasure and crown jewels kept there by Hira Singh. The troops refused to march unless they received the promised increase in pay. Toward the end of December, the Council agreed to increase the monthly pay of each infantry soldier by half a rupee and granted other concessions. Deductions for clothing were remitted, and additional leave was granted. The troops then agreed to move toward Jasrota.

The pay concessions spread to other parts of the army. The irregular cavalry demanded treatment comparable to the regulars, and this was partly conceded. Hill troops in Lahore were enlisted with their pay nearly doubled. Men discharged by the previous government from the regular army were restored, together with mutsaddis, munshis and several sinecure officers.

On 30 December, messengers from Gulab Singh brought assurances of allegiance and requested confirmation of his jagirs. On the same afternoon, Sultan Muhammad Khan Barakzai reported that Gulab Singh had asked him to raise 10,000 Afghans for service at pay rates equal to those of the Lahore army. Sultan Muhammad Khan refused because of jagirs recently granted to him by the Lahore Darbar. The Darbar promised him further jagirs and asked him to prevent Muhammad Akbar Khan from joining Gulab Singh.

On 31 December, the Darbar confirmed Gulab Singh's jagirs and gave assurances of protection, while also increasing the force intended for Jasrota. Ten battalions of infantry, with increased cavalry and artillery, were ordered to the hills under Sham Singh Attariwala, who had volunteered his services. Revenue officers in lands farmed to Gulab Singh were ordered to keep the revenue in deposit. The force in Hazara was ordered to move quickly toward Kashmir and then Jammu. Suchet Singh's widow was declared heir to his jagirs. Sardar Ranjodh Singh, brother of Lehna Singh Majithia, was appointed to govern the hills after conquest, and the smaller hill rajas were called on to cooperate against the Jammu family.

== Negotiations and unrest ==
Gulab Singh and the Lahore Darbar exchanged proposals while Gulab Singh prepared for war. His negotiations with the Darbar gave him time to complete his preparations. Reports also circulated about divisions in his favour in Peshawar and the Derajat. He sought to influence officials and sardars through promises of large payments. Bhai Ram Singh and Diwan Dina Nath had received bonds for many lakhs of rupees, payable after the settlement of the affair. Gulab Singh also sent Sher Singh Attariwala, a relative of Sham Singh Attariwala who had been in Jammu as a refugee from the previous government, in an effort to detach Sham Singh from the Darbar's side.

Sham Singh Attariwala marched from Lahore toward Jasrota near the end of the first week of January 1845. Lahore remained unsettled after his departure. Bhai Ram Singh, described as one of the most influential men in Lahore and as a partisan of Gulab Singh, stopped attending the Darbar. Political changes and party intrigues continued at the capital.

Military disorder also continued in Lahore and the provinces. The movement of a large force to the hills and the dispersal of other troops to nearby stations reduced insecurity in the capital. Regular troops in the provinces mutinied, attacked or expelled officers, plundered, and committed excesses. Such disturbances occurred in Kashmir, Peshawar, Muzaffarabad, Hazara, the Derajat and Kot-Kangra. Some officers and local authorities restored order through payments, after which the rejected officers were received back following submission to the soldiers.

Diwan Mul Raj and General Gulab Singh Pohovindia were engaged in settling the disturbance at Muzaffarabad up to 4 January. Hazara, the country from Attock to Rohtas, Wazirabad and the Derajat were also disturbed, while Multan was treated as an exception. The outbreaks were linked to Gulab Singh's agents, although weakened government in those regions also contributed to the disorder. In Peshawar, Gulab Singh's contacts with Amir Dost Muhammad Khan had not succeeded because of Afghan divisions.

== Operations around Jasrota ==
Gulab Singh publicly professed submission to the Sikh Empire while preparing for war and seeking support from enemies of the Sikhs. His intrigues reached the Darbar, Peshaura Singh, the army, and the south side of the Sutlej. His agents repeatedly offered and received terms of submission for discussion by the Council.

The first Sikh operations against Jasrota were poorly coordinated. Ranjodh Singh Majithia was given command, but after limited operations he was checked by one or two night attacks. General Rattan Singh Mann was then sent with a separate force. More than half of his men deserted, and attacks by hillmen left him inactive. Sham Singh Attariwala sent complaints to the Lahore Darbar about weak measures and the condition of the army. He urged unified operations, asked that Ranjodh Singh and Rattan Singh be placed under his orders, and requested more troops and guns so that the force could be concentrated at one point.

Sham Singh halted a few miles short of Jasrota and took several smaller forts containing property of value. These actions improved the morale of his troops. Under difficult conditions, he reduced Bissoli and other minor hill forts. The Lahore Darbar accepted his request to place the other commanders under his authority and to send more support.

While the regular army moved toward Jasrota, the irregular army spread around Jammu. The operation at Jasrota succeeded quickly, but the movement of the regular force there delayed a direct assault on Jammu. During the campaign, Sikh troops committed massacres against the local population around Jasrota. According to Bal, approximately 800 women from all castes around Jasrota were seized and carried away. While Contemporary accounts also describe misconduct by Sikh troops during the operation. Earlier in the campaign, the Sikh garrison at Jasrota was attacked and defeated while plundering the wives of Hira Singh as they prepared to commit sati. These actions alienated sections of the local population and hill troops, many of whom subsequently rallied behind Gulab Singh against the Sikh army.

== Proposed settlement ==
Gulab Singh sent Sardar Chattar Singh of the Attari family and other agents to Lahore with authority to negotiate. The agents did not secure a suspension of hostilities, but a proposal was made to transfer command away from Sham Singh Attariwala. A peace agreement bearing the saffron hand was delivered to Bhai Ram Singh for transmission to Gulab Singh if the required conditions were met. The terms still required discussion and confirmation by the troop panchayats on 15 and 16 January 1845.

The proposed settlement was initially rejected by the troops, who responded with threats and insults directed at the negotiators. It was subsequently accepted after several modifications. Chopra attributes the initial rejection to the intrigues of General Mewa Singh Majithia, who opposed leaving his position on the Council for service in the hills. The eventual acceptance of the revised terms was linked to the counter-intrigues of the Rani and her brother, Jawahir Singh. Despite the agreement, the settlement remained precarious, as Gulab Singh was considered unlikely to ratify it except as a means of gaining time or as a basis for further negotiations.

The Lahore Darbar faced an increasingly unmanageable army and a rapidly dwindling treasury. Prolonged military operations threatened to exhaust its finances and provoke political unrest before the wealth of the Jammu rajas could be secured by force. As a result, the Darbar sought to obtain at least part of those resources through negotiation.

Gulab Singh also had reasons to delay a direct struggle. Sham Singh Attariwala had revived the courage of the troops, concentrated the field force, and taken Bissoli and other minor forts. Afghan cooperation had been slow and weak. In Hazara and Muzaffarabad, Diwan Mul Raj and General Gulab Singh Pohovindia had calmed their own troops and limited the effect of Gulab Singh's agents. The Sayads of Rojhan abandoned their conquests, released most of their prisoners, and withdrew to their own valley.

Gulab Singh also faced divisions within his family. Suchet Singh's widow joined the Darbar against him after being denied her claim to her husband's property. His nephew, Mian Jawahir Singh, resented Gulab Singh's refusal to recognise him as the independent successor of Raja Dhian Singh and opened separate negotiations with the Sikhs. Gulab Singh also risked the defection of his troops to the Sikhs because of Sikh intrigues and higher pay.

== Surrender of Jasrota ==
In accordance with the terms of the treaty, Gulab Singh dispatched messengers to arrange the surrender of Jasrota Fort to the Sikh forces. This brought Mian Jawahir Singh's separate negotiations with the Sikhs to an end. The fort was subsequently occupied by around 2,000 Sikh troops under General Rattan Singh Mann. Mian Jawahir Singh, accompanied by the family and retainers of the late Hira Singh, withdrew to Jammu, while Wazir Bachna, the administrator of Hira Singh's hill territories, remained behind to hand over the treasury and military stores to the Sikh authorities.

News of the surrender reached Lahore on 23 January 1845. The anxiety and uncertainty that had gripped the Darbar gave way to celebrations, during which gifts were distributed.
