= Khakha–Bomba Rebellion (1843–1844) =

1844 uprising in Hazara and the Kashmir borderlands against Sikh rule

Khakha-Bomba Rebellion
Date	May–November 1844
Location	Hazara region and Kashmir
Result	Sikh victory (Note: "A number of rebellions took place during the ministry of Hira Singh, but all of them failed.") (Note: "The whole of the Jhelum Valley and the bordering region of Muzaffarabad was reconquered (November 1844).")

Belligerents
Sikh Empire	Muslim Confederation

Commanders and leaders
Wazir Hira Singh; Shaikh Ghulam Muhy-ud-Din; Shaikh Imam-ud-Din; Hukam Singh Malwai; Gulab Singh Pahuvind; Dewan Mulraj of Hazara; Colonel Dhoukal Singh †	Zabardast Khan (POW); Sultan Najaf Khan of Khori; Sher Ahmad Khan; Habibullah Khan of Pakhli †; Husain Khan of Muzaffarabad; Maulavi Mohammad Ismail

Strength
~6,500 hill troops, with additional battalions, cavalry and artillery reported under the main field command	Unknown; assemblies reported as 5,000+ in some localities

Casualties and losses
Unknown	Unknown

The Khakha-Bomba Rebellion (1843–1844) was a major uprising against Sikh rule that began in Hazara and spread toward Muzaffarabad on the Kashmir frontier, before entering the north-western Kashmir Valley (Baramulla and Sopore). The rising occurred amid violent factional politics at Lahore after a succession of assassinations and was described in several accounts as taking on the character of a religious war against Sikh authority.

== Background ==
In the early 1840s the Sikh Empire experienced acute political instability. A compromise involving the Sandhawalia chiefs and leading court figures broke down, followed by a sequence of assassinations between 1842 and 1844. This violence enabled Hira Singh, Son of Dhian Singh, to assume effective control of government in the name of the minor Maharaja Duleep Singh, but factional rivalries intensified, particularly with the vassal Jammu ruler Gulab Singh and his allies.

Kashmir was governed by Shaikh Ghulam Muhy-ud-Din after 1841, with responsibilities extending to frontier security and the management of garrisons in the hill tracts west of the Valley. The Hazara–Kaghan–Muzaffarabad region contained chiefs and religious networks that had previously supported anti-Sikh mobilisation in the north-west. In this context, local unrest could rapidly expand into a broader frontier revolt when Lahore's authority appeared weakened.

== Prelude ==
=== Zabardast Khan's Revolt of 1837-1838 ===
In 1837–1838, during the governorship of Col. Mihan Singh, Zabardast Khan declared independence and, for a time, Sikh control over the district was seriously undermined. He was assisted by Sultan Najaf Khan of Kahori, and the movement advanced toward Baramulla before being checked near Uri, where Sikh forces regained the initiative and Zabardast Khan's only son was killed in the fighting. The subsequent crackdown included the taking of hostages, including Zabardast Khan's grandson Rehmatullah, who later died in prison during the governorship of Shaikh Ghulam Muhy-ud-Din and Rehmatullah's widow was later married by Shaikh Imam-ud-Din.

=== Revolt of 1844 ===
Despite this earlier confrontation, Zabardast Khan is described as having remained broadly loyal to Sikh authority until the murder of Maharaja Sher Singh in 1843, after which conditions in the frontier hill tracts deteriorated rapidly. Muzaffarabad was an early disturbed spot in 1844. Raja Zabardast Khan was reported to have revolted again against the Sikh Empire and to have been defeated and arrested by the Kashmir governor toward the end of May 1844. He was then called upon to pay a fine of one lakh of rupees; on declaring inability to pay, he resigned his rights to the territory in return for a jagir of ten thousand rupees a year.

Later Zabardast Khan was arrested while he was praying in a mosque, followed by imprisonment at Hari Parbat in Srinagar. His removal is consistently presented as a trigger for wider mobilisation among allied hill chiefs and communities in the Muzaffarabad sector. Early rebel action included expansion of attacks on Sikh positions a relief force from Srinagar was dispatched but failed to restore control, and rebel pressure began to extend toward the Kashmir Valley.

== Course of the insurrection ==
=== Hazara rising and expansion toward Muzaffarabad ===
The uprising is consistently linked to the Hazara region, where Habibullah Khan of Pakhli attacked a Sikh garrison at Khori. Relief troops from Srinagar repelled the attack and Habibullah Khan was killed. Within months, a renewed coalition reported to include Habibullah Khan's son and allied hill chiefs captured Khori and advanced toward Muzaffarabad, defeating small garrisons along the route.

Intelligence reports reaching Lahore described heavy fighting around Kuttor/Khuttour and large assemblies of insurgents, with Sikh detachments forced to retire in the face of superior numbers. By late 1844 unrest extended across a wide arc from Peshawar to the Jhelum, with disturbances reported in the Derajat and Multan as well.

=== Entry into the Kashmir Valley ===
After gaining momentum on the frontier, rebel forces entered the Kashmir Valley, occupying Baramulla and threatening Sopore, placing them within striking distance of Srinagar. Reports described widespread violence in the Baramulla-Sopore sector, including looting and arson during the incursion.

The breakdown of local security was compounded by reported desertions among Muslim troops in provincial service and by the disruption of communications with the northern dependencies. Additional anxieties at Lahore, the Capital of the Sikh Empire, included frontier threats around Peshawar and concerns over foreign observation and intrigue during the crisis.

=== Jammu-Kabul intrigues ===
The crisis unfolded alongside rivalry between the Lahore ministry and Jammu. One account describes Gulab Singh as attempting to pressure the Lahore government by fostering conditions that would embarrass it, including encouraging opposition among Pathans in the Peshawar and Derajat zones and promoting instability on the Kashmir frontier. In parallel, intelligence reported petitions and coordination requests moving between Kashmir and Jammu during the disturbances, underscoring Jammu's importance to relief routes and auxiliary manpower.

The Sikh Empire also faced anxiety from the Barakzai Dynasty and the Peshawar frontier. Dost Mohammad Khan was described as intriguing with Gulab Singh regarding Peshawar and, as pressure mounted, issuing demands that contributed to uneasiness at Lahore. The same narrative links this frontier situation to wider mobilisation Khybaris and Yusufzais were reported as being excited against Sikh authority, with northern Yusufzais assisting insurgents in Hazara, while the insurgency among groups in Pakhli, Dhamtur and the Khakha and Bhumbha tracts was described as becoming increasingly violent and religiously framed, communications with Gilgit were also disrupted.

== Sikh resurgence ==
=== Sikh preparations and mobilisation ===
As communications with Kashmir became unreliable and large parts of the frontier districts were reported in rebel hands, the Sikh Empire treated the crisis as a strategic emergency and prepared a multi-column relief and reconquest effort. In Kashmir, the governor requested immediate assistance only after the scale of the outbreak became clear, while also facing constraints on releasing troops for sustained operations in the Baramulla-Sapore sector and for a subsequent advance into the hill country.

Several developments intensified the urgency of preparations, including concerns over heightened British attention in the Sutlej region and suspicion generated by the movements of an English deserter in Srinagar. The Lahore leadership also sought to stabilise internal politics sufficiently to conduct operations, including reconciliation measures with Jammu in order to secure hill auxiliaries and routes for reinforcement.

Operational preparations focused concentration of forces from multiple directions. Columns were ordered to enter Kashmir by the Poonch road and from Jammu, and field forces in Hazara were directed to advance toward Muzaffarabad troop movements were also ordered from the Peshawar area toward the Jhelum frontier.

=== Suppression and Pacification ===
As rebel gains expanded toward Muzaffarabad and into the north-western Kashmir Valley, the Lahore government ordered a coordinated response from Hazara and Kashmir. Orders were issued for General Dhounkal Singh in Hazara to move troops toward Muzaffarabad in concert with the Kashmir authorities. His battalions reportedly achieved initial successes, but he died during the campaign.

Following his death, unified field command was assigned to General Gulab Singh Pahuvind. The main field force under this command is described as including ten battalions of disciplined infantry, one regiment of cavalry, and twenty guns, although operational tempo was affected by reported shortages of transport and supplies on the mountain routes. Reinforcements were also directed to advance by the Jammu and Punch approaches, with the intention of restoring communications and relieving threatened garrisons.

In the Hazara sector, Gulab Singh Pahuvind was joined by the forces of Dewan Mulraj of Hazara, the provincial administrator there. Together they advanced on Muzaffarabad and retook it after defeating the Muslim Confederation. One account further states that, during the reconquest, punitive measures were applied in the surrounding countryside, including the burning of Muslim-inhabited villages, looting, and the taking of large numbers of prisoners (including non-combatants). After securing Muzaffarabad, the field forces moved toward Srinagar, where the rebel confederates were again defeated the same account describes comparable massacres following these operations.

== Aftermath and consequences ==
The post-campaign settlement combined coercion with political restoration. Zabardast Khan was released and restored at Muzaffarabad, on terms that included payment of Rs. 50,000 on a bond earlier executed, described in the same account as having been treated by the Sikh authorities as forfeited. Other accounts likewise describe Zabardast Khan's reinstatement and the reassertion of Sikh paramountcy in the frontier hill tracts after the reconquest.

Although the insurrection was suppressed, the insurrection exposed the vulnerability of Sikh authority in the north-west during the Lahore court crisis. The Kashmir governorship later passed to Shaikh Imam-ud-Din, who remained in office when Kashmir was transferred to Gulab Singh under the treaty of 16 March 1846 following the First Anglo-Sikh War.

== Bibliography ==
- Parmu, R. K. (1977). A History of Sikh Rule in Kashmir, 1819–1846. Department of Education, Jammu and Kashmir Government.
- Kohli, Sita Ram (1967). Sunset of the Sikh Empire. Orient Longmans. ISBN 9780804688147.
- Gupta, Hari Ram, ed. (1975). Panjab on the Eve of First Sikh War: A Documentary Study of the Political, Social, and Economic Conditions of the Panjab as Depicted in the Daily Letters Written Chiefly from Lahore by British Intelligencers During the Period from 30 December 1843 to 31 October 1844 (2nd rev. ed.). Chandigarh: Publication Bureau, Panjab University. ISBN 978-0-88386-653-5.
- Malik, Ikram Ali (1970). The History of the Punjab, 1799–1947. Delhi: Neeraj Publishing House.
- Saraf, Muhammad Yusuf (1977). Kashmiris Fight for Freedom: 1819–1946. Ferozsons.
- Chopra, Barkat Rai (1969). Kingdom of the Punjab: 1829–45. Vishveshvaranand Institute.
