= Punjab medal =

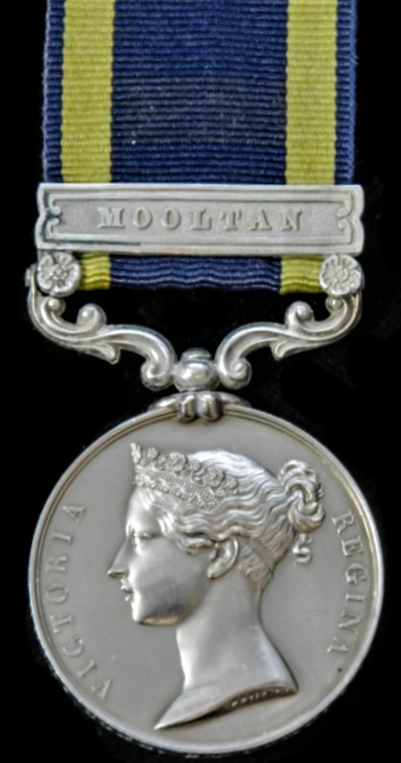
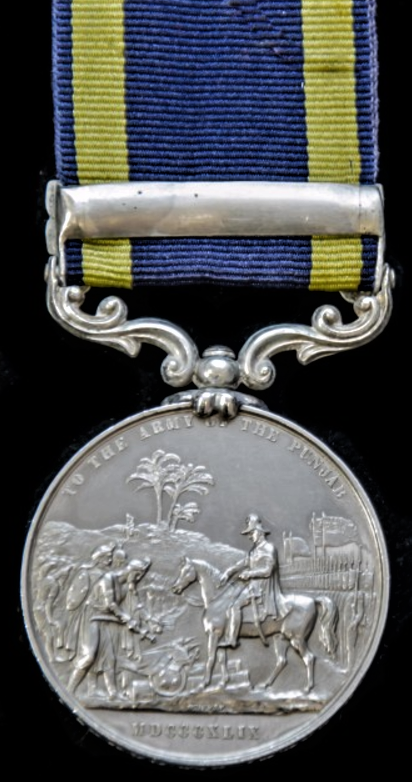
- Obverse and reverse of the medal
- Type: Campaign medal
- Awarded for: Campaign service
- Description: Silver disk, 36mm diameter
- Presented by: United Kingdom of Great Britain and Ireland
- Eligibility: British and Honourable East India Company forces
- Campaign: Punjab 1848–49
- Clasps: Mooltan; Chilianwala; Goojerat
- Established: 2 April 1849
- Ribbon bar of the medal

The Punjab medal was a campaign medal issued to officers and men of the British Army and Honourable East India Company who served in the Punjab campaign of 1848-49, which ended in the British annexation of the Punjab.

The medal was approved on 2 April 1849, for award to all who served in the Punjab between 7 September 1848 and 14 March 1849.

== Description ==
- A circular silver medal, 36 millimetres (1.4 in) in diameter, designed by William Wyon.
- Obverse: the diademed head of Queen Victoria with the legend VICTORIA REGINA.
- Reverse: a scene showing Sir Walter Gilbert receiving the Sikh surrender with the legend TO THE ARMY OF THE PUNJAB above, and below MDCCCXLIX, the year 1849 in Roman numerals.
- Naming: the medals were impressed in roman capitals with the recipient's name and details.
- Ribbon: the 31.7 millimetres (1.25 in) wide ribbon is dark blue with a yellow stripe towards each edge.

== Clasps ==
Three clasps were authorised, although no medals were awarded with more than two, since no unit qualified for both the Mooltan and Chilianwala clasps. The medal was issued without a clasp to those who were present in the Punjab but did not take part in any of the principal battles.
The three clasps awarded were:

- Mooltan

7 September 1848 – 22 January 1849. Awarded to troops engaged in the siege of Multan. In total, 18,967 of these clasps were awarded, 2,900 to Europeans and 16,067 to Indian troops.

- Chilianwala

13 January 1849. Awarded to troops under the command of Lord Gough who engaged with the Sikh army of Sher Singh and Lal Singh near Chilianwala. In total, 21,453 of these clasps were awarded, 4,300 to Europeans and 16,153 to Indian troops.

- Goojerat

21 February 1849. Awarded to troops under the command of Lord Gough who defeated the Sikh army of Sher Singh at Goojerat. In total, 32,960 of these clasps were awarded, 6,200 to Europeans and 26,760 to Indian troops.

The clasps read downwards from the top of the medal, varying from the usual practice of placing the earliest clasp nearest the medal.

== Bibliography ==
- Mussel, J (ed) – Medals Yearbook – 2015, (2014), Token Publishing.
- Joslin, Litherland, and Simpkin (eds), British Battles and Medals, (1988), Spink
