= Ratta Banna =

Pakistani village

Coordinates: 33°58′07″N 73°05′13″E

Ratta Banna is a village in the Haripur District of Khyber Pakhtunkhwa province, Pakistan. The village lies to the north of the Lora road and is situated in an area where are there granite deposits nearby

== History ==
In 1848, during the Second Anglo-Sikh War, about 800 matchlock men (Tahirkhelis and Mashwanis) under the command of James Abbott were stationed in the village to do battle against the forces of Chattar Singh Attariwalla. However the men appeared to have changed allegiance and did not fire on the Sikh forces allowing them to steadily advance seeming inexorably towards Ratta Banna and victory, Abbott described how he "felt a sickness stealing over" his heart that the men he "had trusted most were faithless."
