= Pashaura Singh =

Sikh prince

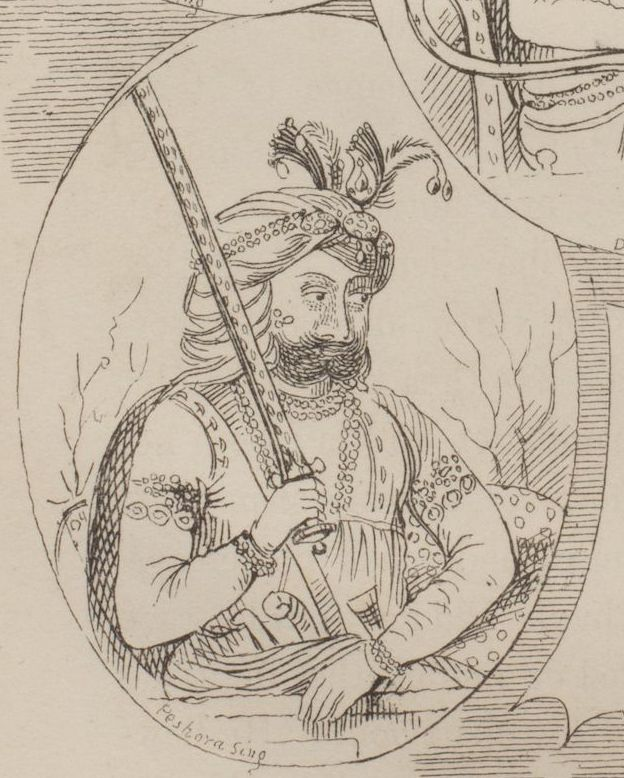
- Portrait published in 'A History of the Reigning Family of Lahore' (1847)
- Born: 1821; Sialkot, Punjab, Sikh Empire
- Died: 11 September 1845 (aged 23–24); Attock, Punjab
- Spouse: Jeevan Kaur; Uttara Kanwar
- Issue: Jagjoth Singh.
- House: Sukerchakia
- Father: Maharaja Ranjit Singh
- Mother: Rani Daya Kaur

Kunwar Pashaura Singh (1821 – 11 September 1845), also spelt Pishore Singh or Peshawara Singh, sometimes styled as Shahzada, was the younger son of Maharaja Ranjit Singh and Rani Daya Kaur.

Maharaja Ranjit Singh named Pashaura as he had recently conquered Peshawar.

Pashaura's son, Jagjoth Singh was born in 1844 and was granted a half-share of a large jagir in Baraich, Oudh, after the annexation. He was a great philanthropist and public benefactor, who performed valuable services to the government during the Second Afghan War. He had a son Amar Singh. (b. 1876).

After the assassination of Maharaja Sher Singh, Pashaura made a bid for the throne of the Sikh Empire.

To hide from his political rivals and avoid assassination, he took refuge in British territory, from 1844 to 1845. He then returned to the Punjab, revolted, and was pardoned several times.

He was eventually strangled to death by Sardar Chattar Singh Attariwalla, at Attock, while in safe custody, 11 September 1845.

Jagjoth Singh was his only one son.

== Emergence as a contender for the throne ==
Little is recorded about the early life of Pashaura Singh during the reigns of Ranjit Singh and his first four successors. After the assassination, on 15 September 1843, of Maharaja Sher Singh and his vizier Raja Dhian Singh Dogra, the Khalsa proclaimed Duleep Singh as Maharaja and Dhian Singh's son, Hira Singh Dogra, as vizier.

Later that year, Pashaura Singh and his elder brother, Kashmira Singh, were recorded as having joined the camp of the holy men, Baba Bir Singh at Nauraṅgābād, near Tarn Tāran. The camp had become the centre of Sikh revolt against the dominance of the Dogras and was a base for several Sikh sardars and commanders and a volunteer army of 1,200 musketeers and 3,000 cavalry. In May 1844, Hira Singh despatched a force of 20,000 men and 50 cannons under the command of Mian Labh Singh to destroy Baba Bir Singh's camp. Baba Bir Singh told his men not to fight "How can we attack our brethren?” he said. He was killed by a shell while meditating over the Holy Book. Kashmira Singh was also killed in the cannonade, but Pashaura Singh escaped.

Pashaura Singh visited Lahore later in 1844 in an unsuccessful attempt to form an alliance with Hira Singh, who, however had his own problems. He had lost favour with the Khalsa, because of several unpopular actions, including: his involvement in the death of Baba Bir Singh, his confiscation of the jagirs of some of the army commanders, and his attempt to poison the Regent, Maharani Jind Kaur. He escaped from Lahore with several loads of gold and silver stolen from the treasury, but was pursued by the Khalsa army, who killed him on 21 December 1844.

== Renewed bid for the throne ==
During the second half of 1844, Pashaura Singh travelled around the Punjab seeking support against the Dogras. He crossed the Sutlej River and visited the British cantonment at Ferozepur. However, the British were unresponsive, being already in negotiation with Gulab Singh Dogra, brother of Dhian Singh.

On learning of the death of Hira Singh, Pashaura Singh returned to Lahore on 1 January 1845. He was received with honour and goodwill in the court, and was offered presents of jewels, elephants and horses. Some of the army commanders proposed that he should be made Maharaja in place of the six-year-old Duleep Singh. However, some influential members of the Supreme Council of the Khalsa and the regimental committees supported the young Maharaja and his mother, Maharani Jind Kaur. They requested Pashaura Singh to return to his estates, with a promise of an increase in his jagir, and the Khalsa army ordered him to leave Lahore.

A new vizier, the Maharani's brother, Jawahar Singh Aulakh, was appointed on 14 May 1845 and immediately despatched artillery against a force being assembled by Pashaura Singh. The Prince capitulated, but was allowed to go free.

== Attock rebellion ==
Two months later, in July 1845, Pashaura Singh took the fort of Attock with a handful of Pathan followers and declared himself to be the ruler of the Punjab. He raised fresh levies and, with the money that the fort yielded to him, tried to obtain help from the chiefs within the kingdom, from Jehlum to Khaibar, and even opened negotiations with Dost Muhammad, then ruler of Afghanistan.

After hearing of the rebellion in Attock, Jawahar Singh Aulakh ordered Chattar Singh Attariwalla and Malik Fateh Khan Tiwana to recapture the fort and defeat Pashaura Singh. The prince was forced to surrender the fort on 30 August 1845 and place himself at the disposal of Chattar Singh, after receiving assurances of safe passage to Lahore and the retention of his estates at Sialkot.

However, Jawahar Singh Aulakh considered that the prince posed too great of a threat to his nephew, the young Maharaja, and sent instructions that Pashaura Singh be disposed of immediately. The prince was secretly removed from his personal bodyguard on 11 September 1845, and taken back by Chattar Singh Attariwala to Attock where he was strangled to death. For his part in this, Jawahar Singh Aulakh was speared to death by the Khalsa army on 21 September 1845 in front of his sister, the agonised Maharani.

== Family ==
=== Wives ===
According to Priya Atwal, the wives of Pashaura Singh were:

- Jeevun Kaur, given a pension of Rs. 1,800, had a son named Juggut Singh
- Sada Kaur, given a pension of Rs. 720
- Utur Kaur, given a pension of Rs. 720

=== Issues ===
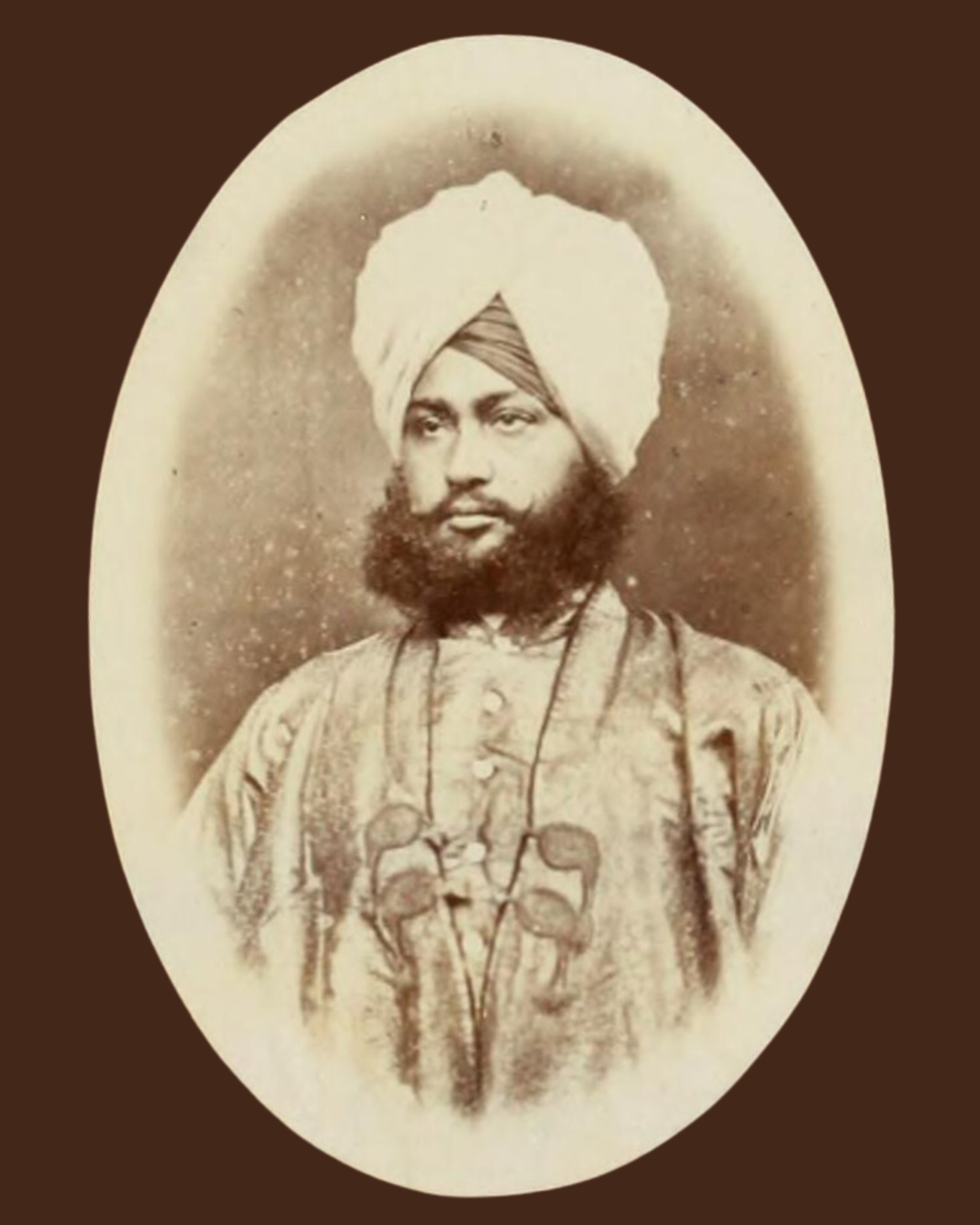
Photograph of Jagjot Singh, grandson of Ranjit Singh and son of Pashaura Singh

The male issues of Pashaura Singh were:

- Juggut Singh, son of Jeevun Kaur, given a jagir outside Punjab by the British worth Rs. 5,000

== Sources ==
Pashaura Singh, Kanvar The Sikh Encyclopedia. Retrieved 9 November 2011.
