= Shaikh Ghulam Muhy-ud-Din =

Muslim official of Sikh Empire (died 1846)

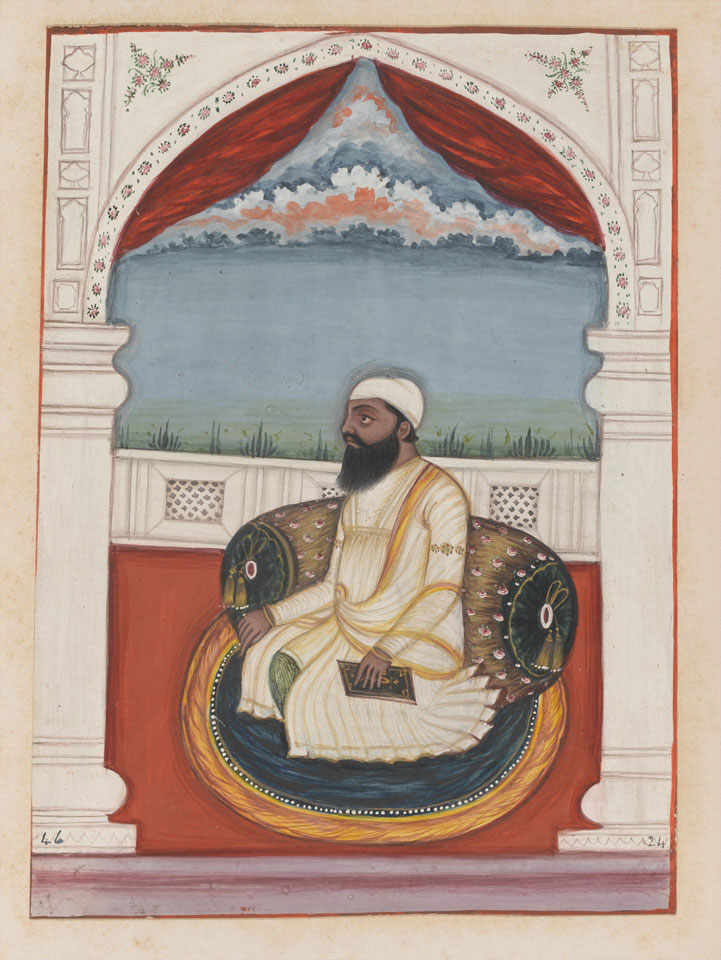
- Sheikh Mohi-od-deen, Watercolour by a Company artist, Punjab, c. 1865

Sikh governor of Doaba
- In office 1834–1841
- Monarch: Ranjit Singh
- Preceded by: Desa Singh Majithia
- Succeeded by: Shaikh Imam-ud-Din

Sikh governor of Kashmir
- In office 1841–1846
- Preceded by: Mihan Singh
- Succeeded by: Shaikh Imam-ud-Din

Personal details
- Born: Unknown Hoshiarpur, Jalandhar Doab
- Died: 24 March 1846 Srinagar, Sikh Empire

Shaikh Ghulam Muhy-ud-Din (d. 24 March 1846) was a Muslim official of Sikh Empire who served as the governor (nazim) Jalandhar Doab during 1834–1841 and governor of Kashmir during 1841–1846. He was succeeded by his son Shaikh Imam-ud-Din in both positions.

== Biography ==
Muhy-ud-Din was born in a poor Punjabi Muslim family in Hoshiarpur to Shaikh Ujala, who worked as a munshi for Sardar Bhup Singh of Guler State. Starting his life as a shoe-maker, he took up service of diwan Moti Ram and accompanied his son Kirpa Ram when the latter was appointed governor of Kashmir in 1827. Kirpa Ram entrusted to him the deputy-governorship. After four years Kirpa Ram was recalled along with Muhy-ud-Din and both of them faced imprisonment and fines due to the allegations of mismanagement.

After a year Muhy-ud-Din regained his position and was sent with prince Sher Singh to Kashmir to rehabilitate the shawl industry, again serving as deputy-governor during 1832–1834. In 1834 he was appointed governor of Jalandhar Doab and remained so until 1841.

Muhy-ud-Din was appointed to Kashmir in 1841 after the previous governor, Mehan Singh, was killed in a mutiny. In 1843 a Sikh army numbering 7000 men was defeated at Kahori by Sher Ahmad, the Bomba chief. In the same year Muhy-ud-Din ended several discriminatory measures that had been imposed on the Kashmiri Muslims since the Sikh conquest in 1819, including reopening the Jamia Masjid for prayers after 25 years and permitting the calling of Azan.

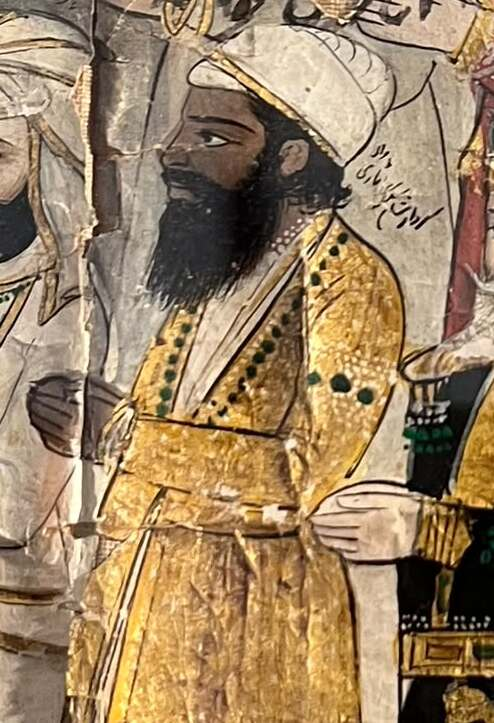
Sheikh Ghulam Mohiuddin, detail of a painting of the court (darbar) of Maharaja Ranjit Singh, Rambagh Museum, Amritsar, ca.1849–50

In February 1845 he offered the British to transfer his allegiance to them on the condition of keeping the possession of Kashmir. However, the British government was not interested in elevating any Muslim chief to power in the sensitive region. Muhy-ud-Din unexpectedly died on 24 March 1846, possibly due to the shock of hearing the news of Kashmir being sold to the Dogra dynasty of Jammu under the treaty of Amritsar. He is also suspected of having been poisoned. Muhy-ud-Din was buried in the khanqah of Makhdum Shaikh Hamza in Hari Parbat, Srinagar. He was succeeded by his son Shaikh Imam-ud-Din as the governor.

== Sources ==
- Sufi, G. M. D. (1949). "Chapter XI – Kashmīr Under the Sikhs". Kashīr: Being a History of Kashmīr. Vol. II. Lahore: The University of the Punjab. OCLC 1504631.
- Parmu, R. K. (1977). "Chapter V: An Essay in Harmony". A History of Sikh Rule in Kashmir (1819–1846). Government Press, Srinagar. OCLC 7597898.
- Din, Hameed-ud (2011). "Ghulam Mohiy Ud-din, Shaikh". In Singh, Harbans (ed.). The Encyclopedia Of Sikhism. Vol. II E–L (Third ed.). Punjabi University Patiala. ISBN 978-8-1-7380-204-1.
- Lawrence, Walter Roper (1895). "Political History". The Valley of Kashmir. London: H. Frowde. OCLC 1149016.
