= Jawahar Singh (wazir) =

Wazir of the Sikh Empire in 1845

Jawahar Singh ਜਵਾਹਰ ਸਿੰਘ
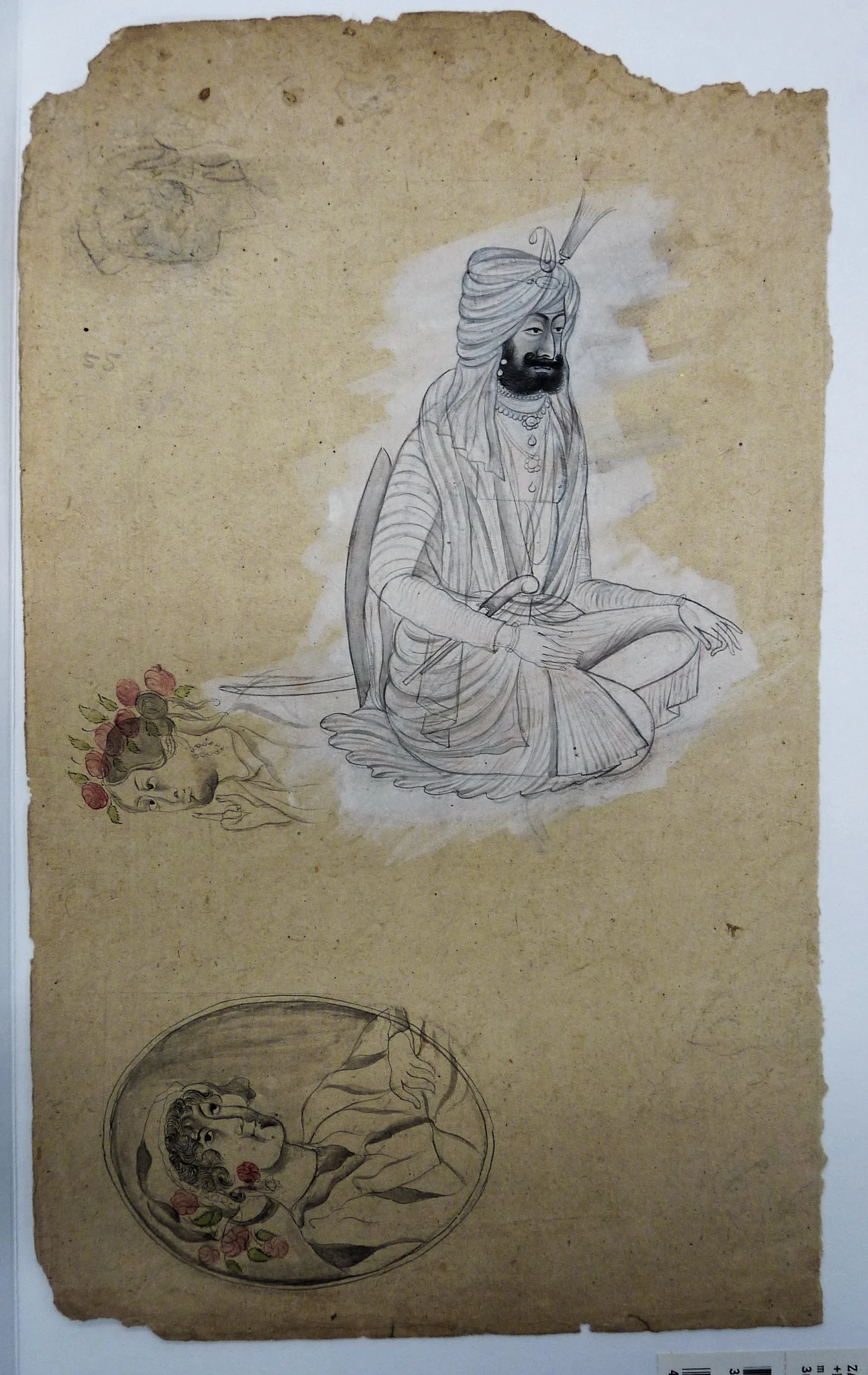
- Portrait of Sardar Jawahar Singh, the wazir of the Sikh Empire, and two European ladies in medallions

Wazir of the Sikh Empire
- In office 14 May 1845 – 21 September 1845
- Monarch: Duleep Singh
- Preceded by: Hira Singh
- Succeeded by: Lal Singh

Personal details
- Born: 1814; Gujranwala, Sikh Empire
- Died: 21 September 1845 (aged 30–31); Lahore, Sikh Empire (now Punjab, Pakistan)
- Relatives: Jind Kaur (sister); Duleep Singh (nephew)

Jawahar Singh Aulakh (1814 – 21 September 1845), also anglicised as Jawaheer Singh or Jawahir Singh, was Wazir of the Sikh Empire from 14 May 1845 until his assassination by the Sikh Khalsa Army on 21 September of the same year, under his nephew Maharaja Duleep Singh. He was the elder brother of Jind Kaur, Duleep's mother.

== Biography ==
Jawahar was the son of Manna Singh Aulakh, and the brother of the future Maharani Jind Kaur, whose son Maharajah Duleep Singh he was appointed guardian and tutor of. He was eventually superseded as Duleep's tutor by Lal Singh, who was appointed by Wazir Hira Singh. Hira Singh later had Jawahar imprisoned on suspicion of making treasonous overtures to the East India Company, and during his imprisonment he was beaten and tortured by a Brahmin named Jodha Ram. Upon Hira Singh's fall from power, Jawahar, Lal Singh, and Gulab Singh all put themselves forward for the position of Wazir; the Maharani selected her brother as Wazir on 14 May 1845. He held the position only briefly, during a tumultuous nine months in which he persecuted those who had antagonised him in the past, including Jodha Ram, who was mutilated. A heavy drinker, Jawahar distrusted, and was distrusted by, the Sikh Khalsa Army, and relied more upon the troops of Alexander Gardner.

His most significant action was his alleged order of the murder of the rebel Prince Pashaura Singh, which was carried out after Pashaura had been offered safe conduct and surrendered. The Khalsa, or Sikh army, believed that Jawahar had personally ordered the death, fearing that Pashaura presented too great a threat to young Duleep Singh. The leaders of the Khalsa demanded Jawahar present himself before them on 21 September 1845, which he did after much prevarication and attempts at bribery.

Jawahar met with the Khalsa on the appointed date, with an escort of elephants and people including the Maharani, and the Maharaja himself seated beside him, in an attempt to ensure his own safety. The soldiers, however, removed the escort and dragged away the Maharani, causing Jawahar to panic: Duleep was pulled out of Jawahar's arms and taken to the Maharani, and the Wazir was bayoneted, dragged from his elephant, and speared to death, supposedly being stabbed fifty times.

== Gallery ==
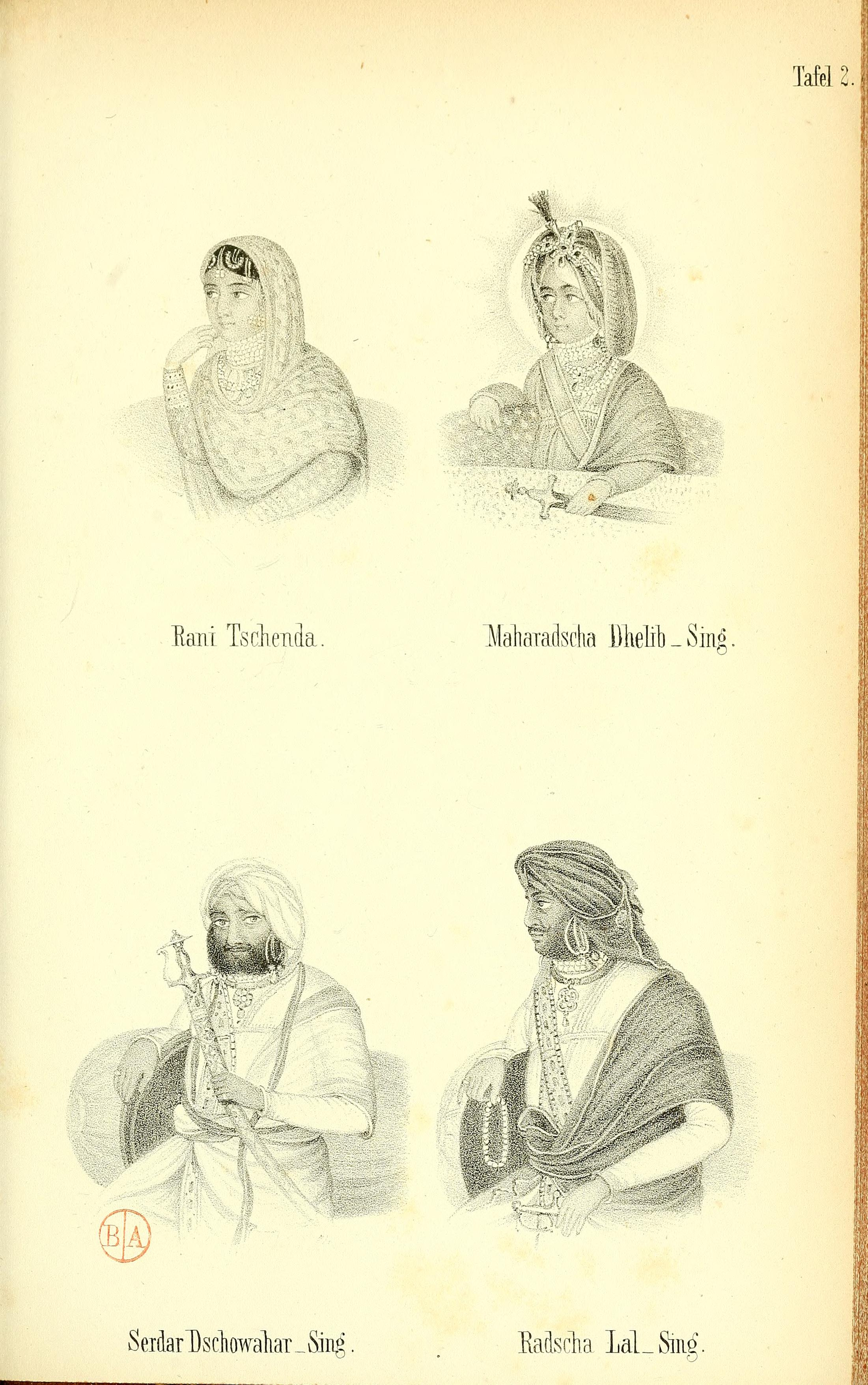
Rani Chand Kaur, Duleep Singh, Sardar Jawahar Singh & Raja Lal Singh

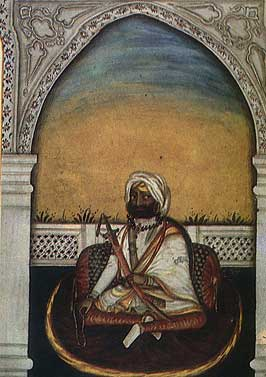
Company painting of Jawahar Singh, ca.1865

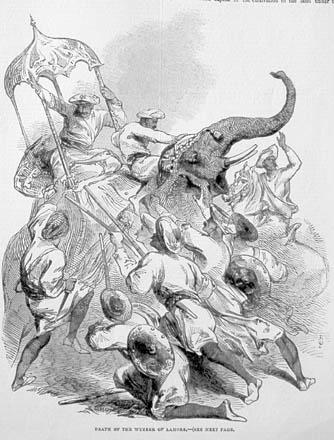
The killing of Jawahar Singh on 21 September 1845, as portrayed in The Illustrated London News
