= Kashmira Singh =

Sikh prince

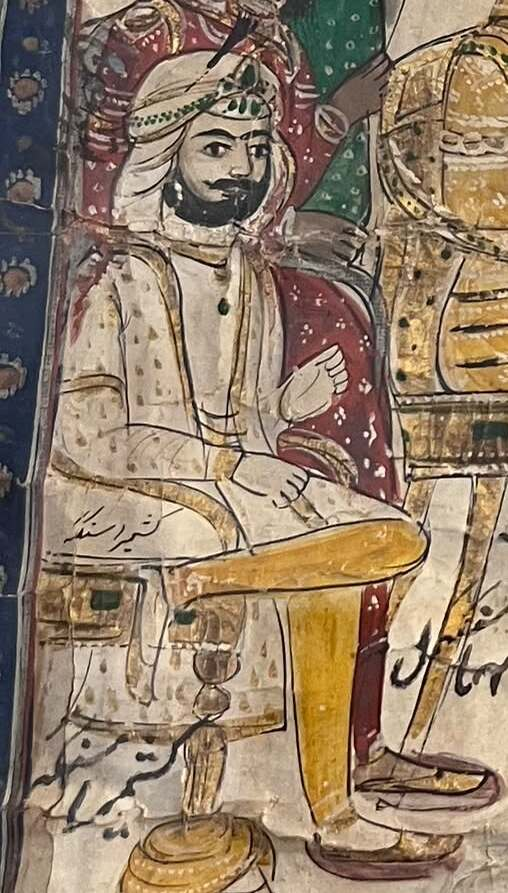
- Kunwar Kashmira Singh, detail of a painting of the court (darbar) of Maharaja Ranjit Singh, Rambagh Museum, Amritsar, ca.1849–50
- Born: 1821; Sialkot, Punjab, Sikh Empire
- Died: 7 May 1844 (aged 22–23); Punjab, Sikh Empire
- Spouse: Chand Kaur; Jind Kaur
- Issue: Fateh Singh
- House: Sukerchakia
- Father: Maharaja Ranjit Singh
- Mother: Rani Daya Kaur

Kunwar Kashmira Singh (1821 - 7 May 1844), sometimes styled as Shahzada was the son of Maharaja Ranjit Singh of the Sikh Empire and Rani Daya Kaur.

Rani Daya Kaur was the daughter of Deewan Singh Virk and his wife, Raj Kaur Virk. She was married to Sahib Singh Bhangi, son of Gujjar Singh Bhangi of the Bhangi Misl in 1789 after his death in 1811 she was married to Maharaja Ranjit Singh via chadar dala ritual.

Kashmir Singh had one son, Sardar Fateh Singh. He was granted a half-share of a large jagir in Baraich, Oudh, after the annexation. He married Rani Lakshman Kaur, daughter of Subadar Jawahir Singh and had one son Fateh Singh.

He was killed in battle against the Sandhawalias, 7 May 1844.

== Family ==
=== Wives ===
According to Priya Atwal, the known wives of Kashmira Singh are:

- Chund Kaur, given a pension of Rs. 1,800, had a son named Futteh Singh
- Jind Kaur, given a pension of Rs. 720

=== Issues ===
The known male issues of Kashmira Singh were:

- Futteh Singh, son of Chund Kaur, given a jagir outside Punjab worth Rss. 5,000 by the British
