= Shaikh Imam-ud-Din =

- Amir-ul-Mulk Jang Bahadur; Amir al-Mu'minin
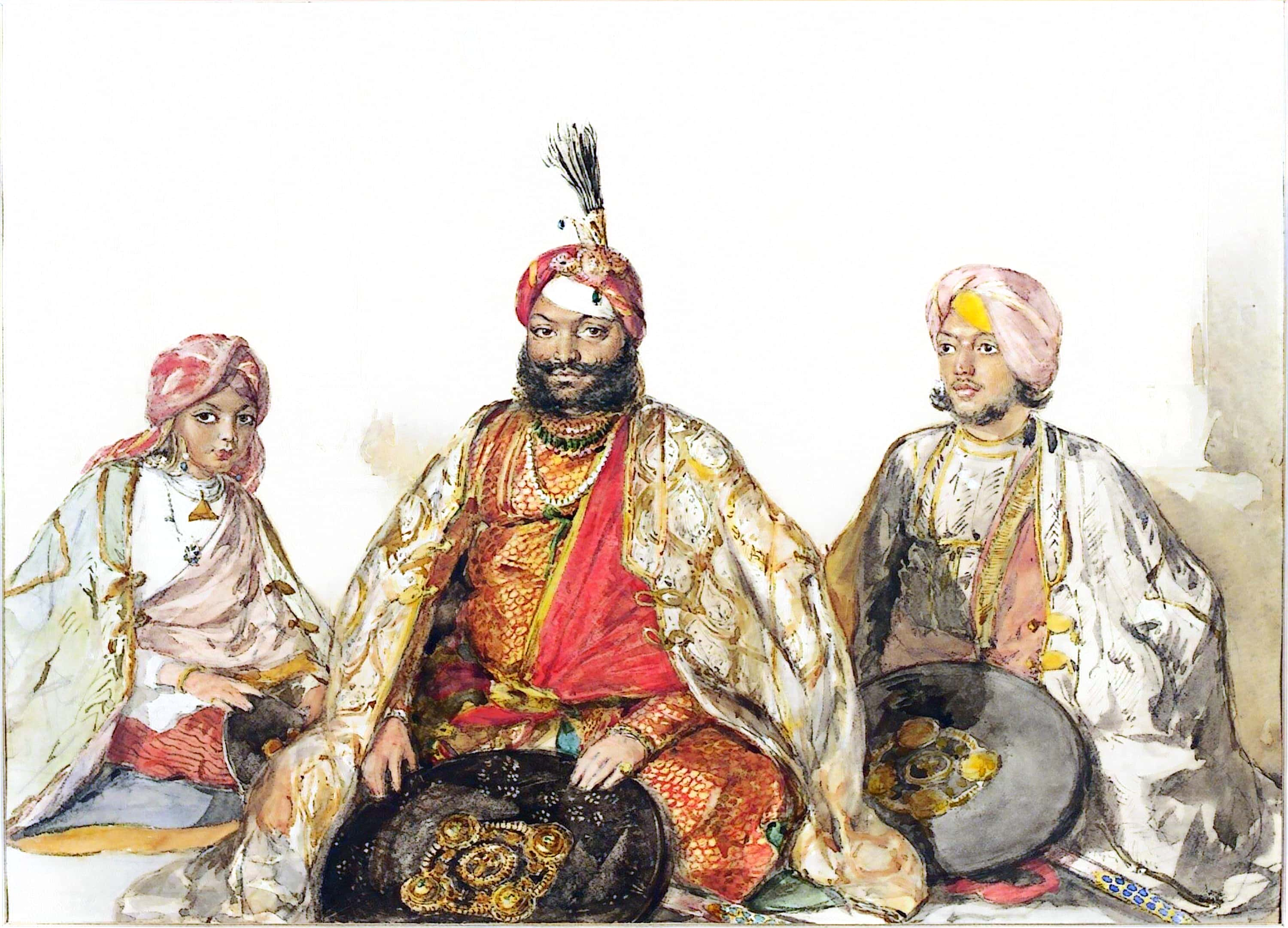
- Sheikh Imam-ud-Din with his sons in c. 1855, as painted by William Carpenter

Sikh Governor of Jalandhar Doab
- Reign: 1841–1845
- Predecessor: Shaikh Ghulam Muhy-ud-Din
- Successor: position abolished

Amir of Kashmir
- Reign: 25 March 1846–25 October 1846
- Predecessor: Shaikh Ghulam Muhy-ud-Din
- Successor: Gulab Singh (as Maharaja of Kashmir)
- Born: Shaikh Imam-ud-Din c. 1819
- Died: 1859; Lahore, Punjab province (present-day Punjab, Pakistan)

Shaikh Imam-ud-Din (Note: Punjabi: شیخ امام دین) (1819–1859) was a Punjabi Muslim noble in the Sikh Empire who served as the governor of Jalandhar Doab during 1841–1846.

He was a son of Shaikh Muhy-ud-Din, the Sikh-appointed governor of Kashmir. On 16 March 1846 Kashmir was sold to Gulab Singh of Dogra dynasty by the British following the defeat of Sikhs in the First Anglo-Sikh War. However, after Muhy-ud-Din's death on 24 March Imam-ud-Din seized the governship of Kashmir and opposed the occupation of the valley by Gulab Singh. He defeated a Dogra contingent sent to take charge from him in August. His rebellion, which lasted for seven months, was ultimately put down in October by a combined British and Sikh army sent from Lahore, and on 9 November, 1846 Kashmir officially became part of the princely state of Jammu and Kashmir.

Imam-ud-Din, described by a contemporary British writer as perhaps "the best mannered and best dressed man in the Panjab", lacked the necessary political foresight and popular support of the Kashmiris to fulfill his ambition of carving out an independent state. He died in 1859, in Lahore, and was buried in the courtyard of Data Darbar.

== Background and early life ==
Shaikh Imam-ud-Din was born into a Punjabi family with humble roots from Hoshiarpur in the Jalandhar Doab. He was the son of Shaikh Ghulam Muhy-ud-Din, governor of Jalandhar Doab and Kashmir for Sikh Empire during 1834–1841 and 1841–1845, respectively. A well-known Sunni Muslim, Muhy-ud-Din ended several discriminatory practices that were imposed on the Kashmiri Muslims after the 1819 Sikh conquest of Kashmir. He opened the Jamia Masjid, Srinagar for prayers after being closed for 25 years and also permitted calling for Azan. He restored the Shankaracharya Temple in Srinagar as well.

Shaikh Imam-ud-Din served as governor of Jalandhar Doab between 1841 and 1845. After Muhy-ud-Din's death in 1845, presumed to be due to poisoning, he replaced his father in Kashmir with the title of Amir-ul-Mulk Jang Bahadur.

== 1846 rebellion ==
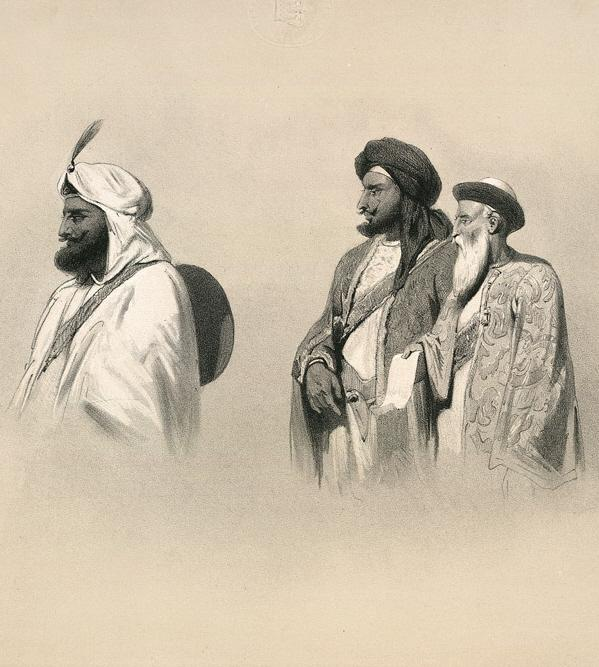
Sheikh Imam-ud-Din along with Ranjur Singh and Diwan Dina Nath, c. 1847. Sketch by Charles Hardinge

By 1846, the politics in the Lahore Darbar were fast deteriorating due to the defeat of the Sikhs in the First Anglo-Sikh War. In the treaty of Lahore, signed between Sikhs and the British on 9 March 1846, Sikh Maharaja was forced to cede Kashmir Valley along with other territories to the British as war reparations, and Kashmir legally ceased to be a part of Sikh Kingdom. On 15 March 1846, the treaty of Amritsar was signed between Gulab Singh Dogra and the British East India Company officials, according to which Kashmir Valley and surrounding areas were sold to Gulab Singh for a sum of 7.5 million Nanak Shahi Rupees. Imam-ud-Din immediately opposed the new circumstances, not wanting to let go the government of Kashmir from his hands. According to some sources, he was convinced by the Prime Minister of Sikh Kingdom, Raja Lal Singh, to resist Dogra occupation of Kashmir due to his old enmity with Gulab Singh. It is also said that Imam-ud-Din was urged by one of his wives, a daughter of Khan of Kohistan Muiz-ud-Din to avoid Kashmir being fallen into Dogra control as Kohistan was a feudatory state of Kashmir. Imam-ud-Din was also incriminated with having sent an emissary to Russian Empire for aid against British, but without any considerable evidence. More significant, however, was him having styled himself as Amir al-Mu'minin after the treaty of Amritsar.

By July 1846, Imam-ud-Din collected 13,000 regular as well as irregular troops to resist Dogra conquest. Supported by chiefs of Rajouri, Bhimber, Jubbal and Bomba in his ambitions, he fought against the occupation of Kashmir by Gulab Singh's officers Diwan Lakhpat Rai and Wazir Ratanu. The battle was fought in September near Shaikh Bagh at Srinagar in a locality now known as Shaheed Gunj; Lakhpat was killed along with a 100 of Dogra troops while Imam-ud-Din sustained 25 casualties. The Dogras were forced to flee. When the news of defeat reached Gulab Singh, he immediately appealed to the British. A force of 10,000 was dispatched under Brigadier Wheeler in the late September, in addition to mobilization of a 17,000 Sikh force for assistance of Brigadier Wheeler. Imam-ud-Din's jagir in Jalandhar was also confiscated and his family was imprisoned. Feeling overwhelmed, Imam-ud-Din started negotiations with British assistant political agent, Lieutenant Herbert Edwards. However, Imam-ud-Din paused when Edwards refused to return his Jalandhar jagir. On 11 October, British forces under Brigadier Wheeler reached Bhimber but were ordered to halt there, as most of Imam-ud-Din's allies defected to the side of the British and Dogras. This further proved the futility of resistance to Imam-ud-Din, who ultimately left the Valley on October, 25 and submitted to Sir Henry Lawrence on November, 1 at Thana. On November 9, 1846, Gulab Singh entered Srinagar alongside British troops as new Maharaja and Kashmir Valley passed into the Dogra control.

== Sources ==
- Malik, Inshah (2018). Muslim Women, Agency and Resistance Politics: The Case of Kashmir. Springer. ISBN 978-3-319-95330-4.
- Singh, Amarpal (2016). The Second Anglo-Sikh War. Amberley Publishing. ISBN 978-1-4456-5024-1.
- Sufi, G. M. D. (1949). Kashir: A History Of Kashmir. Vol. II. Lahore: Publications of the University of the Punjab. OCLC 1504631.
- Parmu, R. K. (1977). A History of Sikh Rule in Kashmir (1819–1846). Government Press, Srinagar. OCLC 7597898.
- Sethi, R. R. (1932). "The Revolt in Kashmir-1846". Journal of the Society for Army Historical Research. 11 (43): 158–167. ISSN 0037-9700. JSTOR 44226042.
- Snedden, Christopher (2015). Understanding Kashmir and Kashmiris. Oxford University Press. ISBN 978-1-84904-342-7.
