= Sham Singh Attariwala =

Sikh Warrior who fought during First Anglo Sikh War

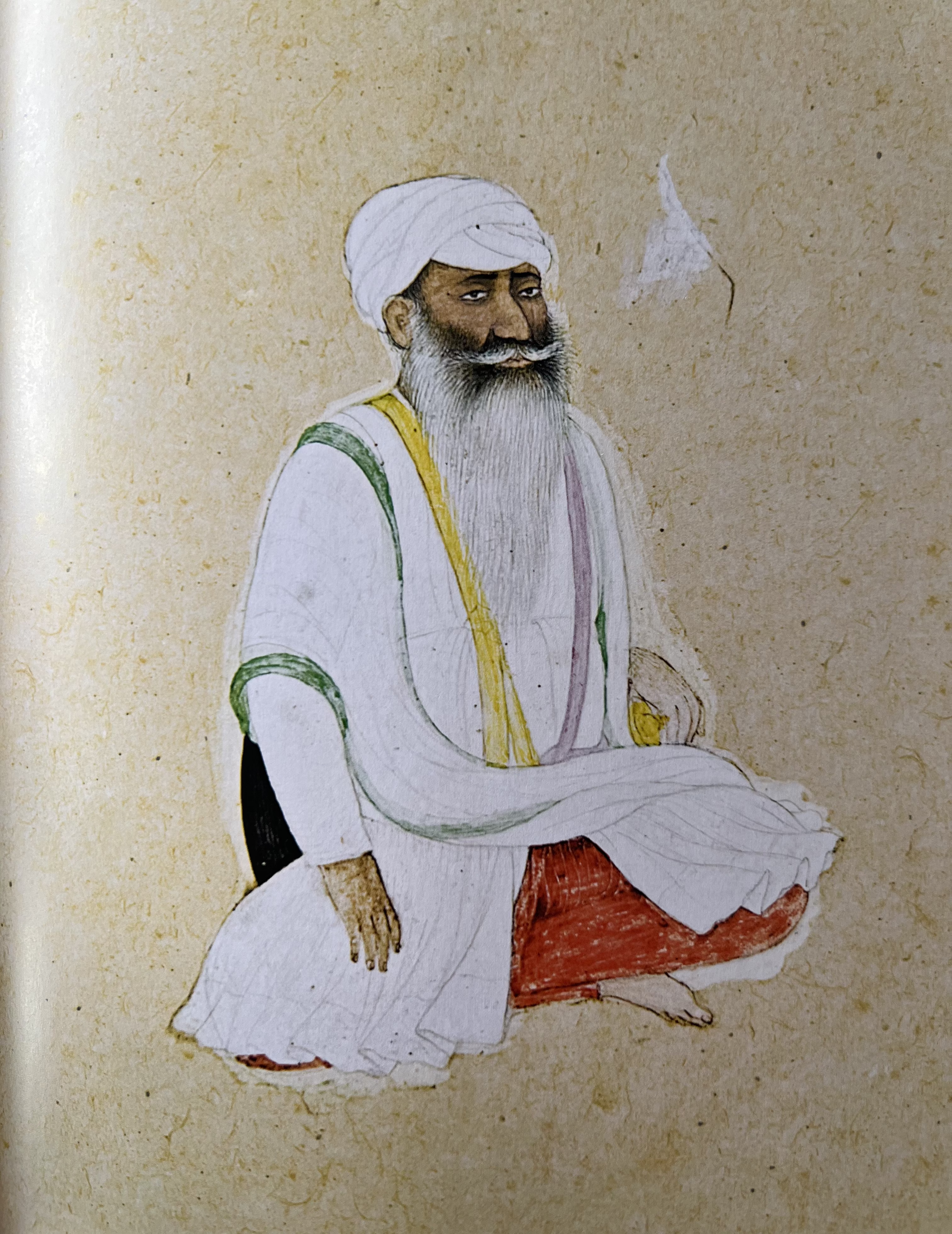
- Painting of Sham Singh Attariwala seated, Sikh school, Punjab Plains, ca.1845
- Born: c. 1790's Attari, Bhangi Misl, Sikh Confederacy (present-day Amritsar district, Punjab, India)
- Died: 10 February 1846 (aged 55-56); Sobraon, Sikh Empire (present-day Tarn Taran district, Punjab, India)
- Spouse: Mai Desa Kaur
- Children: Thakur Singh; Kahn Singh; Nanaki Kaur Atariwala
- Military career
- Allegiance: Sikh Empire
- Branch: Sikh Khalsa Army
- Service years: 1817–1846
- Rank: General of the Sikh Khalsa Army

Sham Singh Attariwala (c. 1790's – 10 February 1846) was a general of the Sikh Empire.

== Biography ==
=== Early life ===
He was born in the 1790's in the town of Attari (a few kilometres from the border of Indian and Pakistani Punjab in India), Amritsar, in the Majha region of Panjab, India. As a child he was educated in Gurmukhi and Persian.

=== Military career ===
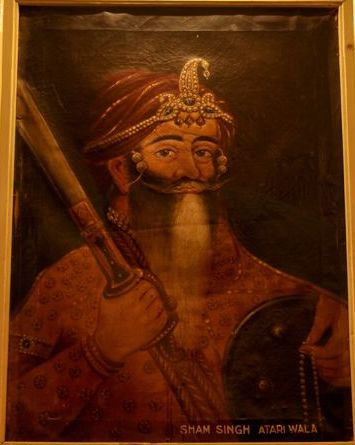
Portrait painting of Sham Singh Attariwala of the Sikh Empire displayed at the gallery at Ram Bagh Palace museum in Amritsar

When Ranjit Singh became the Maharaja of Punjab, he got Attariwala's services at his disposal. Ranjit Singh made him a 'Jathedar' of 5,000 horsemen. He participated actively in many campaigns, notably the campaign of Multan, campaign of Kashmir, campaign of the Frontier Province etc.

Sham Singh Attariwala is famous for his last stand at the Battle of Sobraon. He joined the Sikh military in 1817 and during the Afghan–Sikh Wars participated in the Battle of Attock, Battle of Multan, Battle of Peshawar, and the 1819 Kashmir expedition.

=== Administrative career ===
Sham Singh Attariwala was a prominent courtier at the Lahore Darbar during the reign of Maharaja Ranjit Singh and till the ascendency of Duleep Singh. He was part of the delegation led by the crown prince, Kharak Singh, sent by Maharaja Ranjit Singh to felicitate Lord William Bentinck on 25 October 1831 at the Ropar Meeting. He was the jagirdar of Pasrur, Sialkot, now in Pakistan.

When the boy Duleep Singh became the Maharaja, Sham Singh served on the council of regency.

=== Family ===
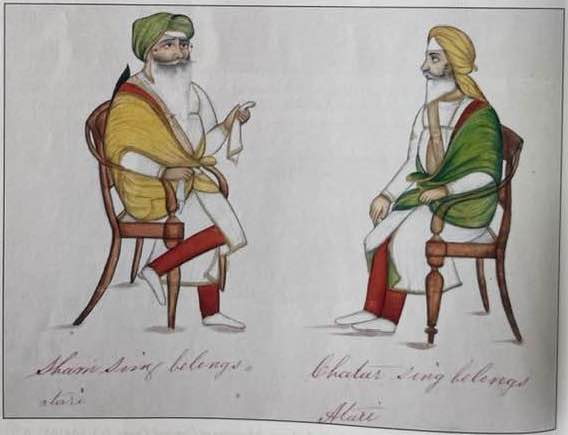
Sham Singh Attariwala and Chattar Singh Attariwala together, ca.1860

Sham Singh's daughter Nanaki Kaur Attariwala, later Kunwarani Nanaki Kaur, was married to Prince Nau Nihal Singh and upon his accession to the throne became the Maharani of the Sikh Empire.

=== Death ===
During the Battle of Sobraon, Sham Singh was killed in battle.
