= Sher Singh Attariwala =

19th-century Sikh general

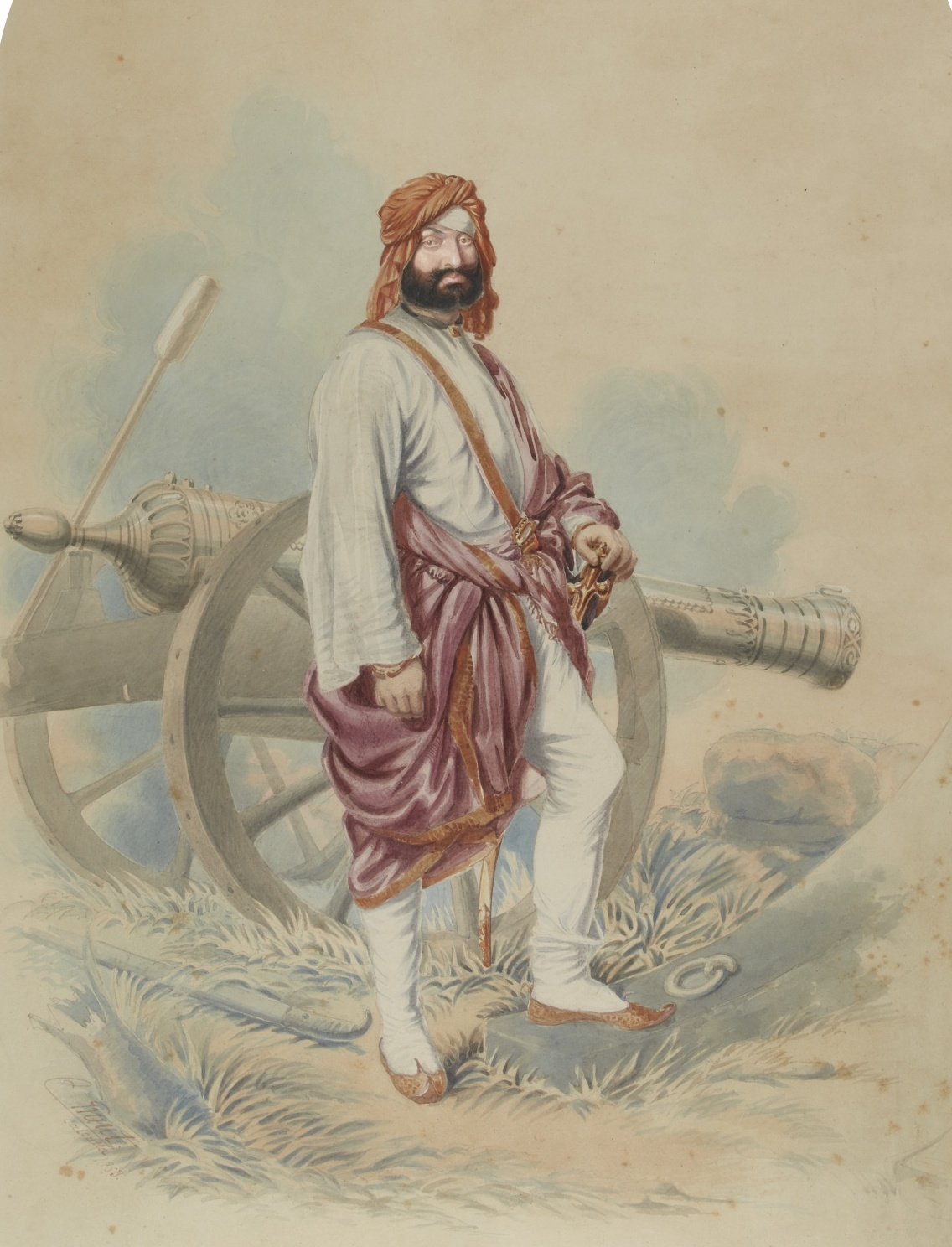
Raja Sher Singh Attariwala standing by a cannon

Raja Sher Singh Attariwala, OBI was a military commander and a member of the Sikh nobility in the Sikh Empire during the mid-19th century in Punjab, who later served the British in the Revolt of 1857.

== Career under Sikh Empire ==
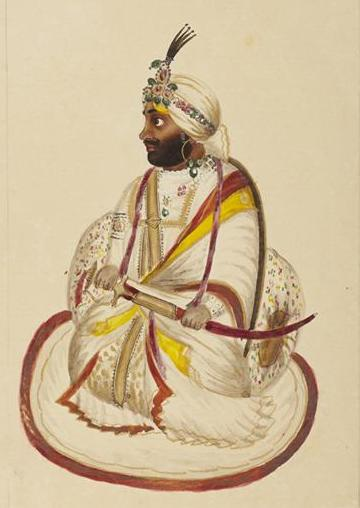
Sher Singh Attariwala

Attariwala commanded the Sikh Khalsa Army in the Second Anglo-Sikh War against the British East India Company. He was a son of Chattar Singh Attariwala. General Sher Singh and the army, under his command, fought against the British at the battle of Chillianwala. Under his command the Sikh Khalsa Army managed to successfully defend its position against numerous British assaults. Both armies retreated after the battle, with both sides claiming victory. The Sikhs suffered 4,000 casualties during the battle, and it was one of the hardest battles fought by the British in India. The loss of British prestige at Chillianwala was one of the factors that contributed to the Indian Rebellion of 1857 some nine years later.

== Later career ==
After annexation, Sher Singh and his father Chattar Singh were lionized by Punjabis, despite them not wishing to be. To limit their influence, the President of the Punjab Board decided to punish the Attariwalas on a flimsy premise that they had fed Brahmins in their village during a solar eclipse, misconstrued as a breach of parole, leading to their arrest and banishment from Punjab as punishment. They would both later die in exile.

With the British victory over the Sikhs during the war, Sher Singh Attariwala was forced into exile from Punjab. The British feared that such a powerful leader could reignite a full-scale war with them. Sher Singh was in exile, at Benares, away from his Punjabi homeland. He was then called to serve with the British to put down the Indian Rebellion of 1857 in Delhi against the Mughals. Successful in his task, he was given the title of Sardar Bahadur, a diamond encrusted tapestry from Bahadur Shah Zafar's treasury and the Order of British India. He also visited England and received a letter from Queen Victoria stating that his descendants would get preferential treatment from British authorities.
