= Lal Singh =

Commander and Wazir of the Sikh Empire

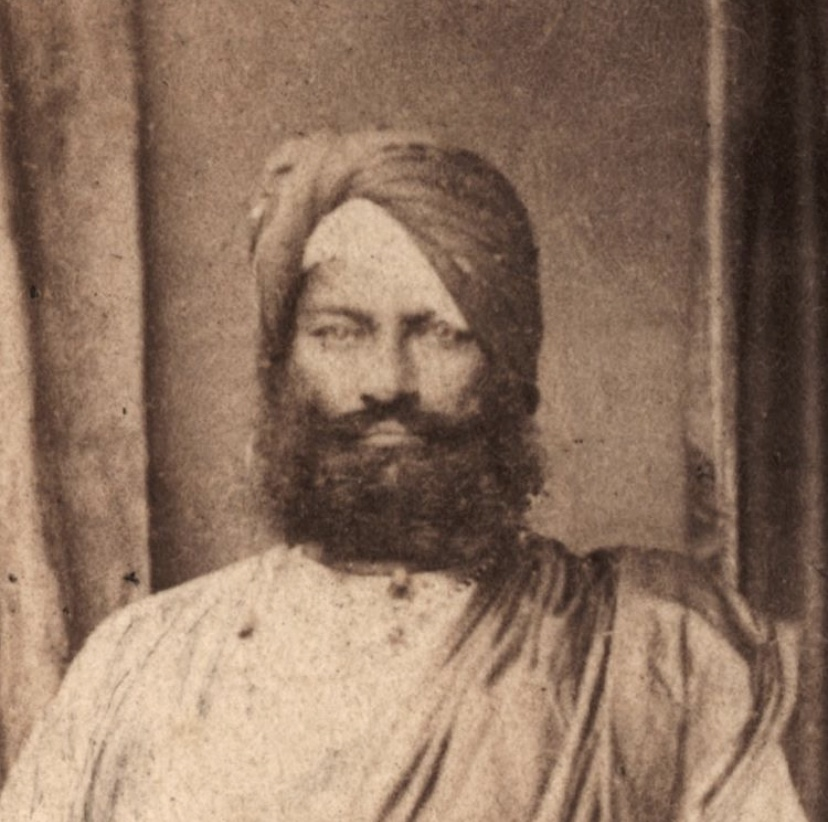
- Sole existing photograph of Lal Singh, circa 1855-1860, Agra or Dera Doon, India

Wazir of the Sikh Empire
- In office 8 November 1845 – 31 January 1846
- Monarch: Duleep Singh
- Preceded by: Jawahar Singh
- Succeeded by: Gulab Singh

Wazir of the State of Lahore

Personal details
- Died: 1866 Dera Doon, British India (now in Uttarakhand, India)
- Occupation: Wazir
- Agency: Khalsa Empire, Jhelum District
- Maharaja: Sir Duleep Singh

Raja Lal Singh (died 1866) was a Wazir of the Sikh Empire and commander of Sikh Khalsa Army forces during the First Anglo-Sikh War. Along with Tej Singh, Lal Singh is believed to have been in the secret employ of the East India Company during the course of the war. Lal Singh was regularly supplying information and even receiving instructions from Company officers, communicating through Captain Peter Nicholson.

== Biography ==
=== Early life ===
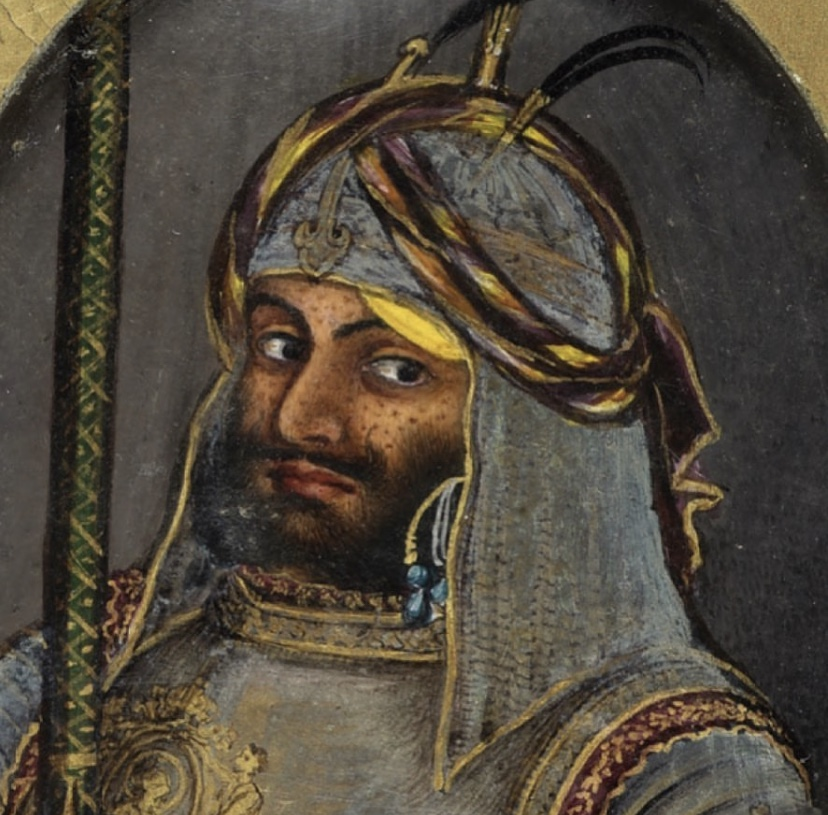
Portrait of Lal Singh, circa 1846-1849, Lahore, Punjab

Lal Singh was a shopkeeper native to Sahgol in the Jhelum District. He entered the service of the Sikh government in 1832, working as a writer in the treasury, and, according to some sources, converting from his original Hinduism to Sikhism in order to secure a place at court. He was patronised by the Wazirs Dhian Singh Dogra and Hira Singh Dogra, gaining favour by engineering, in 1843, the murders of Beli Ram (son of Misr Diwan Chand and another of Lal Singh's benefactors) and Bhai Gurmukh Singh, both of whom were disliked by Hira Singh. Hira gave Lal military commands, granted him the title of Rajah and numerous jagirs at Rohtas, and appointed him tutor to Maharajah Duleep Singh in the place of Duleep's uncle, Jawahar Singh. Nevertheless, when Maharani Jind Kaur turned against Hira Singh, Lal supported the Maharani and her brother Jawahar, helping them to persecute Hira Singh.

Lal quickly won the Maharani's confidence, and became her closest advisor - contemporaries assumed that he was her lover, although Lal denied that in later life - being appointed to the Council of Regency. In February 1845, he was sent to Jammu at the head of an army to negotiate with Gulab Singh. When Jawahar Singh, who had since been appointed Wazir, was assassinated by the Sikh Khalsa Army on 21 September 1845, Lal Singh was made Wazir of the Sikh Empire in his place on 8 November.

=== First Anglo-Sikh War ===
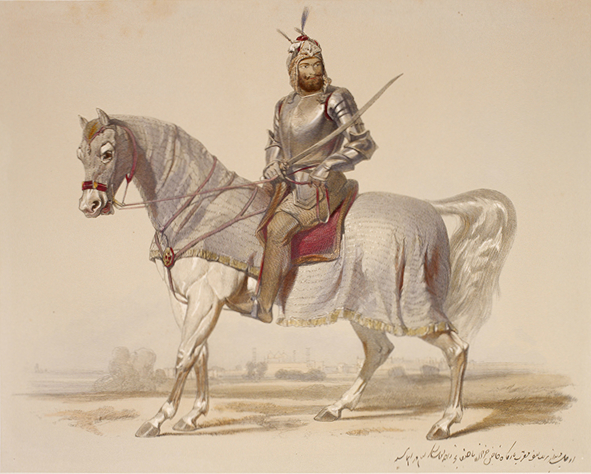
Raja Lal Singh c. 1845 or 1846

During the First Anglo-Sikh War of 1845-1846, Lal Singh took personal command of the Khalsa, but alongside Tej Singh, he was secretly working with the British, sending information to and receiving orders from Captain Peter Nicholson, an officer stationed at Ferozepur. According to Alexander Gardner, who was in Lahore at this time, the Maharani, Lal, and Tej wanted to use the war as an opportunity to neutralise the growing threat of the Khalsa, who were becoming rebellious. At the start of the war, Lal kept his divisions entrenched at Ferozeshah even when the British garrison at Ferozepur was open to attack, allowing John Hunter Littler to retreat from the village and join forces with Hugh Gough. Gough's East India Company army subsequently defeated the Khalsa in the Battle of Mudki, from which Lal fled after a single exchange of fire, and at the Battle of Ferozeshah, which was only won with the help of Tej Singh's treachery. Lal himself supposedly sheltered in a ditch during the battle.

With his own treachery suspected by the men under his command, Lal Singh once again fled with his irregular cavalry, making his way to Lahore, where he offered before the Khalsa to relinquish his office. Although he was relieved of the office of Wazir, replaced by Gulab Singh on 31 January 1846, he retained military command, and was present at the Battle of Sobraon on 10 February. Before the battle, Lal Singh allegedly betrayed the Khalsa once again, sending a map of the Sikh entrenchments to Nicholson. During the battle itself, Lal kept his artillery and cavalry off the field, and once again retired to Lahore.

=== Aftermath and exile ===
In the aftermath of the First Anglo-Sikh War, Lal Singh was rewarded by the British by being confirmed as Wazir of the State of Lahore under Henry Lawrence. However, he fell from grace when it was discovered that he had sent written instructions to the Governor of Kashmir to thwart Gulab Singh's attempts to occupy the Vale of Kashmir, which had been granted him by the British under the Treaty of Amritsar. Lal was tried by a Court of Inquiry, found guilty, and exiled to Agra with a pension of 12,000 rupees a year. He was interviewed by journalist John Lang, who found that he had no complaints about his situation, and had taken up archaeology and surgery as hobbies. He was later moved to Dera Doon, where he eventually died in 1866. He was survived by two sons, Kanwar Tegh Bahadur Singh and Kanwar Balbir Singh, who were prominent local figures in Dera Doon and Mussoorie.
