= Chattar Singh Attariwala =

Sikh general (died 1855)

Sardar Chattar Singh Attariwalla
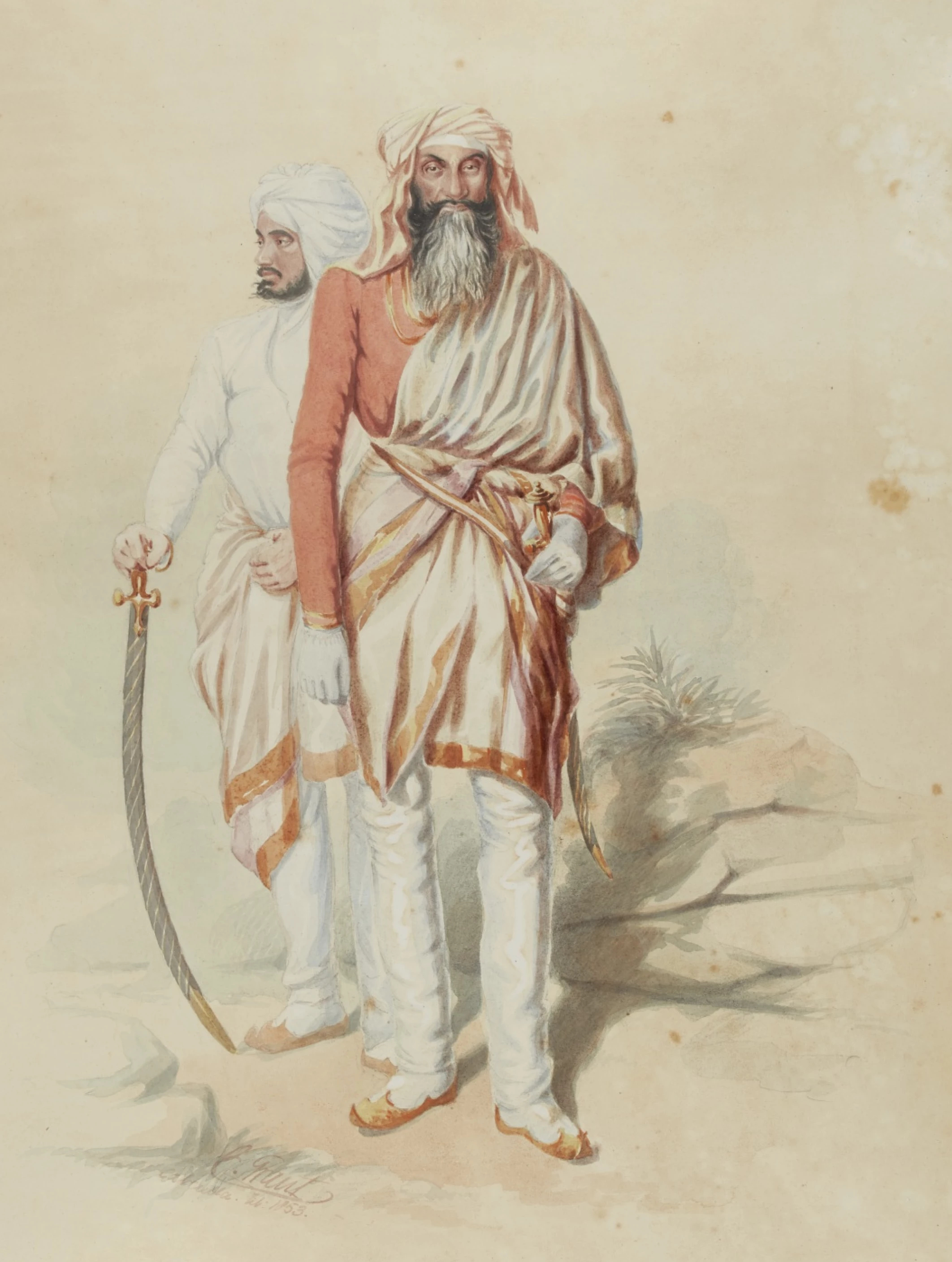
- Portrait of Sardar Chattar Singh Attariwala, with his second son, Attar Singh, by Colesworthey Grant, 1853
- Died: 27 December 1855; Fort William, Calcutta, Bengal Presidency

Chattar Singh Attariwalla, also spelt Chatar Singh Aṭārīvālā, was a military commander in the army of the Sikh Empire and the governor of Hazara in Punjab during the reign of maharaja Duleep Singh. He fought against the British in the Second Anglo-Sikh War.

== Family ==
Chatar Singh was the son of Jodh Siṅgh Aṭārīvālā. He had two sons, Sher Singh Attariwalla and Avtār Singh. Sher Singh commanded the Sikh army against the British East India Company at the Battle of Chillianwala. His daughter Tej Kaur was betrothed to Duleep Singh, but the British Resident, Sir Frederick Currie did not honour the betrothal after the First Anglo-Sikh War.

== Career ==
After the death of his father in August 1815, Chatar Singh inherited large jagir and occupied himself with farming his estates. He rose to political prominence in 1843 after the assassination of Maharaja Sher Singh, and his daughter Tej Kaur was betrothed to the maharaja. In 1846 he was made governor of Peshawar and the following year the Council of Regency recommended him for the title of raja, but he asked that the title should instead be conferred on his son, Sher Singh.

In 1848 he was appointed governor of the Hazara. There he came into conflict with Captain James Abbott, the British Deputy Commissioner of the Hazara District. Abbott alleged that Chatar Singh was conspiring to subvert British authority in the Punjab. The British Resident at Lahore, Sir Frederick Currie commissioned an investigation by Captain John Nicholson who exonerated Chatar Siṅgh, and also justified the defensive measures he had taken to save the besieged capital of Hazārā from Abbott's troops. Despite this, Currie virtually dismissed Chatar Singh and confiscated his jagirs. After this, and the failure of the Resident to honour the betrothal of his sister, Sher Singh, who had been fighting alongside the British, changed sides. In the Second Anglo-Sikh War, Sher Singh fought against the British at the battle of Chillianwala, and was defeated later the same year at the battle of Gujrat. Following the battle, Chatar Siṅgh and his sons, Rājā Sher Siṅgh and Avtār Singh, were imprisoned first at Allāhābād and then at Fort William at Calcutta.

== Post-annexation ==
After annexation, Chattar Singh and his son Sher Singh were lionized by Punjabis, despite them not wishing to be. To limit their influence, the President of the Punjab Board decided to punish the Attariwalas on a flimsy premise that they had fed Brahmins in their village during a solar eclipse, misconstrued as a breach of parole, leading to their arrest and banishment from Punjab as punishment. They would both later die in exile.

Chattar Siṅgh died in Calcutta on 27 December 1855.

== See also ==
- Punjab Army
