= Gulab Singh =

First Maharaja of Jammu and Kashmir from 1846 to 1856

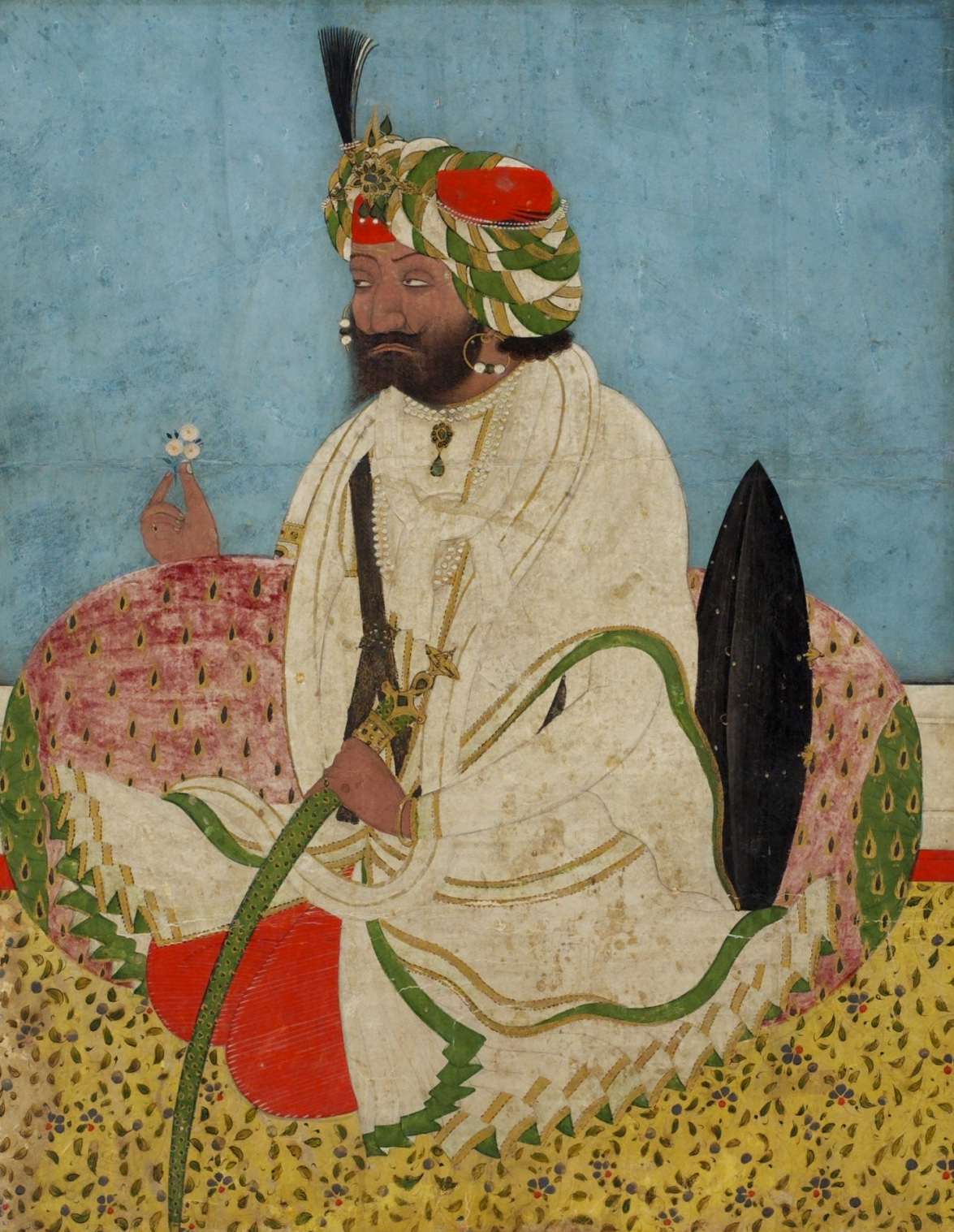
- Gulab Singh in Lahore, c. 1846

Maharaja of Jammu and Kashmir
- Reign: 16 March 1846 – 20 February 1856
- Predecessor: Duleep Singh (Sikh Empire)
- Successor: Ranbir Singh

Raja of Jammu
- Reign: 16 June 1822 – 16 March 1846
- Predecessor: Kishore Singh
- Successor: Himself as Maharaja of Jammu and Kashmir

Wazir of the Sikh Empire
- In office: 31 January 1846 – 9 March 1846
- Predecessor: Lal Singh
- Born: 21 October 1792; Jammu
- Died: 30 June 1857 (aged 64)
- Wives: Nihal Kour, Rani Rakwal
- Issue: Sohan Singh; Udam Singh; Ranbir Singh
Names
- Gulab Singh
- House: Dogra dynasty
- Father: Mian Kishore Singh
- Religion: Hinduism
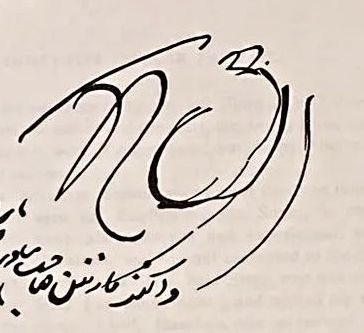
- Signature

Gulab Singh (21 October 1792 – 30 June 1857) was the first maharaja of Jammu and Kashmir. A member of the Dogra dynasty, he was originally a commander and noble in the Sikh Empire. He sided with the British in the First Anglo-Sikh War and briefly became prime minister of the Sikh court in 1846. In the same year he signed the treaty of Amritsar with the British, establishing the state of Jammu and Kashmir under the suzerainty of the British Raj; this treaty formalized the transfer of all lands that were ceded by the Sikhs to the British in the treaty of Lahore.

== Early life ==
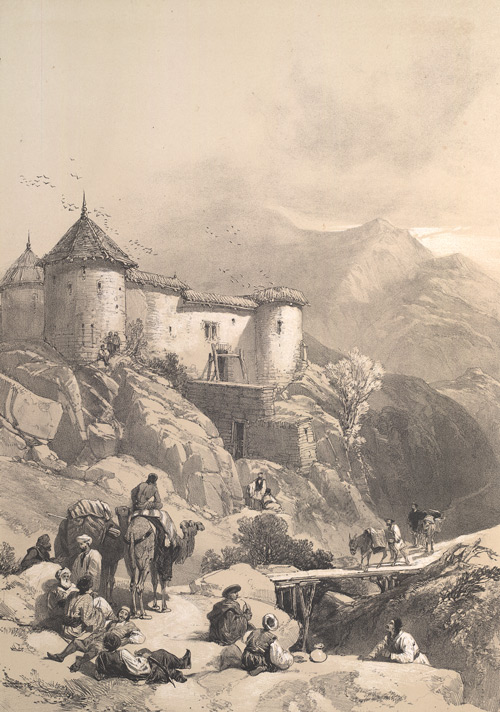
The Hill Fort of Maharaja Gulab Singh, 1846 drawing

Gulab Singh was born on 17 October 1792 in the Hindu Dogra Rajput family which had ruled Jammu since medieval period. His father was Kishore Singh Jamwal. In 1808, following the battle of Jammu, the Dogra kingdom was annexed by Ranjit Singh.

Ranjit Singh appointed a governor to administer the newly conquered area which was expanded in 1819 with the annexation of Kashmir by a Sikh force. Gulab Singh joined the army of Ranjit Singh in 1809 and was sufficiently successful to earn a jagir worth 12,000 rupees and also 90 horses.

In 1820, in appreciation of services rendered by his family and Gulab Singh in particular, Ranjit Singh bestowed the Jammu region as a hereditary fief upon Kishore Singh. Apart from their sterling services, the family's intimate association with the region commended Kishore Singh's candidature to the Lahore court.

In 1821, Gulab Singh captured conquered Rajouri from Raja Agarullah Khan and Kishtwar from Raja Tegh Mohammad Singh (alias Saifullah Khan). That same year, Gulab Singh took part in the Sikh conquest of Dera Ghazi Khan. He also captured and executed his own clansman, Mian Dido Jamwal, who had been leading a rebellion against the Sikhs.

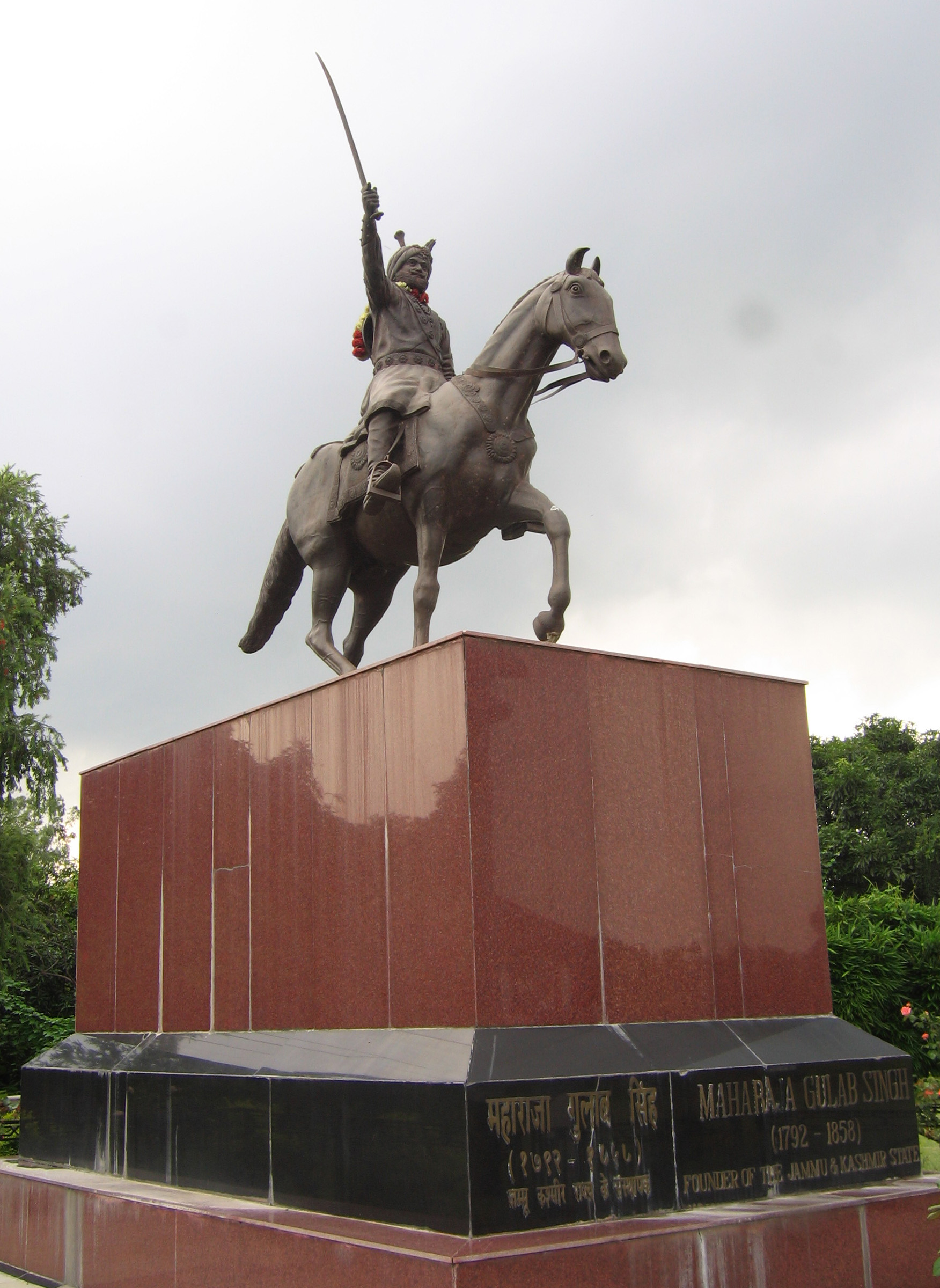
A statue of Gulab Singh at Amar Mahal Palace, India

== Raja of Jammu ==
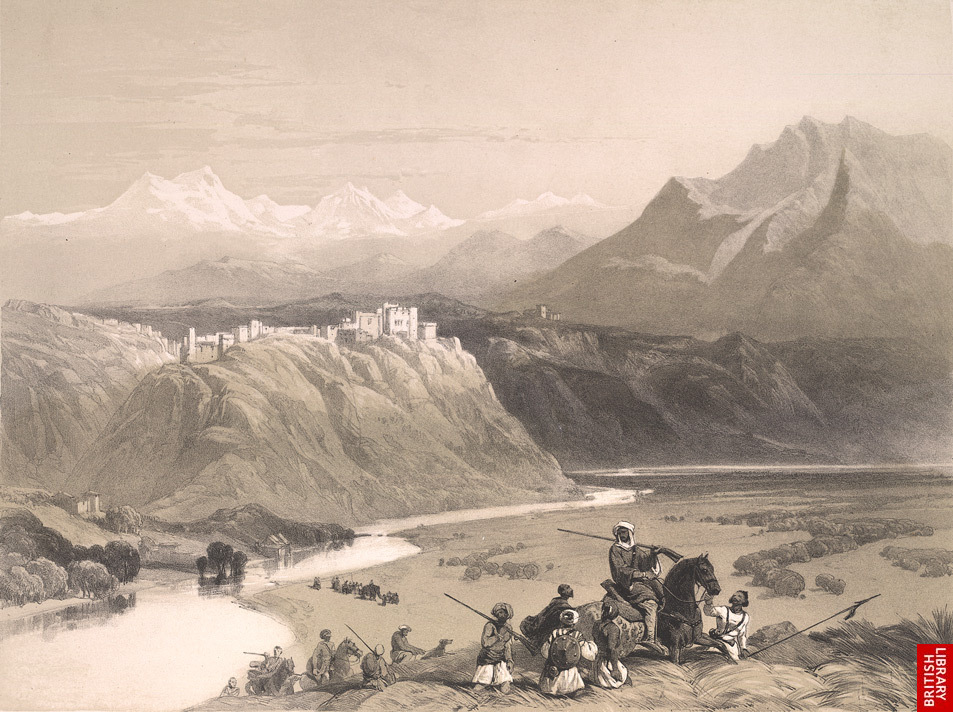
The Mubarak Mandi Palace of Maharaja Gulab Singh, on the banks of Tawi River, Jammu, mid-19th century

Kishore Singh died in 1822 and Gulab Singh was confirmed as raja of Jammu by his suzerain, Ranjit Singh. Shortly afterward, Gulab Singh secured a formal declaration of renunciation from his kinsman, the deposed Raja Jit Singh.

As raja of Jammu, Gulab Singh was one of the most powerful chiefs of the Sikh Empire. Under the imperial and feudal army arrangement, he was entitled to keep a personal army of 3 infantry regiments, 15 light artillery guns and 40 garrison guns.

In 1824 Gulab Singh captured the fort of Samartah, near the holy Mansar Lake. In 1827 he accompanied the Sikh general Hari Singh Nalwa, who fought and defeated a group of Pashtun rebels led by Syed Ahmad Barelvi at the battle of Shaidu. Between 1831 and 1839 Ranjit Singh bestowed on Gulab Singh the jagir of the salt mines in northern Punjab, and the nearby Punjabi towns like Bhera, Jhelum, Rohtas, and Gujrat.

In 1837, after the death of Hari Singh Nalwa in the battle of Jamrud, the Muslim tribes of Sudhan, Tanoli, Karral, Dhund, Satti and Maldayal rose in revolt in Hazara and Poonch. The insurgency of Poonch was led by Shams ud-Din Khan, a Sudhan chief and former confidential follower of Raja Dhyan Singh. Thus the betrayal of Shams Khan against the regime was taken personally, and Gulab Singh was given the task of crushing the rebellion. After defeating the insurgents in Hazara and Murree hills, Gulab Singh stayed at Kahuta for some time and promoted disunion among the insurgents. Then his forces were sent to crush the insurgents. Eventually, Shams Khan and his nephew Raj Wali Khan were betrayed and their heads were cut off during their sleep while the lieutenants were captured, flayed alive and put to death with cruelty. The contemporary British commentators state that the local population suffered immensely.

== Intrigue at Lahore ==
On the death of Ranjit Singh in 1839, Lahore became a center of conspiracies and intrigue in which the three Jammu brothers were involved. They succeeded in placing the administration in the hands of Prince Nau Nihal Singh with Raja Dhian Singh as prime minister. However, in 1840, during the funeral procession of his father Maharaja Kharak Singh, Nau Nihal Singh together with Udham Singh, son of Gulab Singh, died under suspicious circumstances when an old brick gate collapsed on them.

In January 1841, Sher Singh, son of Ranjit Singh tried to seize the throne of Lahore but was repulsed by the Jammu brothers. The defense of the fort was in the hands of Gulab Singh.

After peace was made between the two sides, Gulab Singh and his men were allowed to leave with their weapons. On this occasion, he is said to have taken away a large amount of Lahore's treasure to Jammu.

== Recognition as Maharaja ==
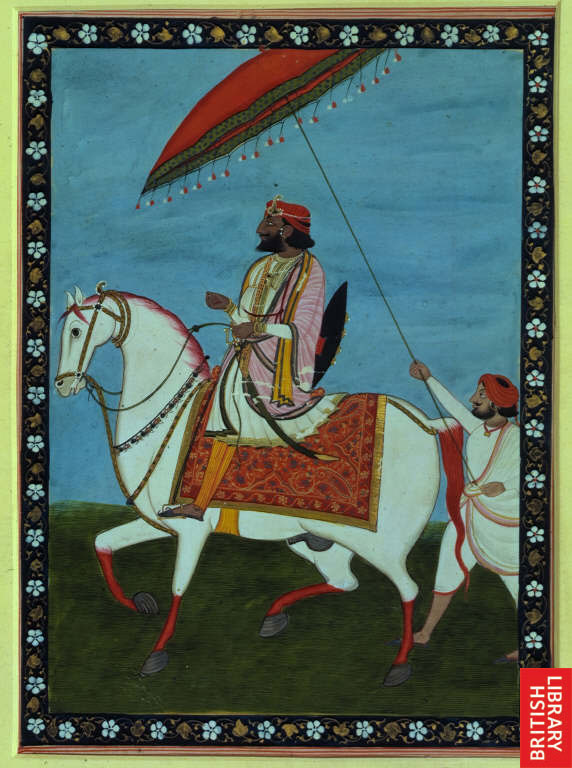
Maharaja Gulab Singh rides a well decorated white stallion across a green field. Circa 1840–45.

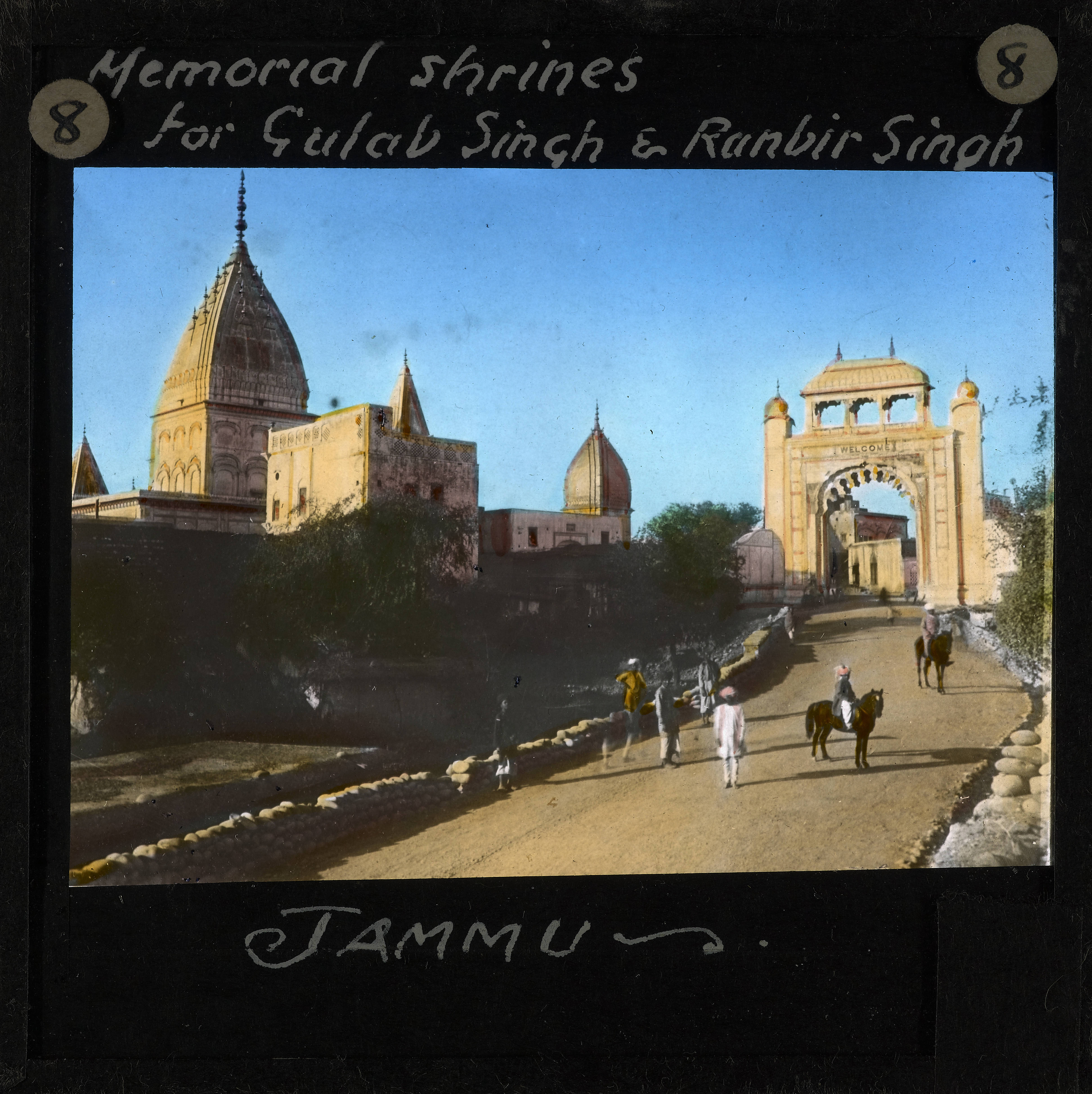
Memorial shrines for Gulab Singh and Ranbir Singh, Jammu, India, ca.1875 to ca.1940

Meanwhile, in the continuing intrigues at Lahore, the Sandhawalia Sardars (related to Ranjit Singh) murdered Raja Dhian Singh and the Sikh Maharaja Sher Singh in 1842. Subsequently, Gulab Singh's youngest brother, Suchet Singh, and nephew, Hira Singh, were also murdered. As the administration collapsed the Khalsa soldiery clamored for the arrears of their pay. In 1844 the Lahore court commanded an invasion of Jammu to extract money from Gulab Singh, reputed to be the richest Raja north of the Sutlej River as he had taken most of the Lahore treasury.

However, Gulab Singh agreed to negotiate on his behalf with the Lahore court. These negotiations imposed an indemnity of 27 lakh Nanakshahee rupees on the raja.

Lacking the resources to occupy such a large region immediately after annexing portions of Punjab, the British recognised Gulab Singh as a Maharaja directly tributary to them on payment of 75 thousand Nanakshahee rupees for the war-indemnity. The angry courtiers of Lahore then incited the governor of Kashmir Imamuddin to rebel against Gulab Singh, but this rebellion was defeated, thanks in great part to the action of Herbert Edwardes, Assistant Resident at Lahore.

In the second Sikh War of 1849, he allowed his Sikh soldiers to desert and go to fight alongside their brethren in Punjab. The treaties of Chushul and Amritsar had defined the borders of the Kingdom of Jammu in the east, south, and west but the northern border was still undefined. In 1850, the fort of Chilas in the Dard country was conquered.

Maharaja Gulab Singh died on the 30th of June 1857 and was succeeded by his son, Ranbir Singh.

== Gulabnama ==
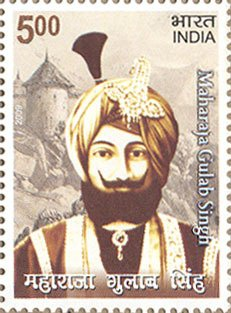
5 Indian rupees postage stamp of Maharaja Gulab Singh released by Government of India on October 21, 2009.

Diwan Kirpa Ram of the diwan family of Eminabad wrote the first biography of Gulab Singh titled Gulabnama in the 19th century in Persian.

K. M. Panikkar describes Gulabnama as an authoritative source;

"This work, though written in the flowery style of the Persian panegyrists, is nonetheless a remarkable historical document, as the Dewan published in it many original documents which are not now available elsewhere. Its facts and chronology are beyond dispute. The Dewan was also fully conversant with the political conditions of the Punjab at the time, and his descriptions of events are vivid and informed by direct knowledge of men and things."

== Bibliography ==
- Bakshi, S.R. (1998), Kashmir History and People, New Delhi: Sarup and Sons, ISBN 8185431965
- Panikkar, K. M. (1930), Gulab Singh, London: Martin Hopkinson Ltd
- Singh, Bawa Satinder (1974), The Jammu Fox, Southern Illinois University Press, ISBN 0809306522
- Rai, Mridu (2004), Hindu Rulers, Muslim Subjects: Islam, Rights, and the History of Kashmir, C. Hurst & Co., ISBN 1850656614

Gulab Singh Dogra dynasty Born: 18 October 1792 Died: 30 June 1857
Regnal titles
Preceded by Jit Singh (as Raja of Jammu (tributary to the Sikh Empire))	Maharaja of Jammu and Kashmir; 1846–1856	Succeeded by Ranbir Singh
