= Shrine of Baba Farid =

Sufi shrine in Pakpattan, Pakistan

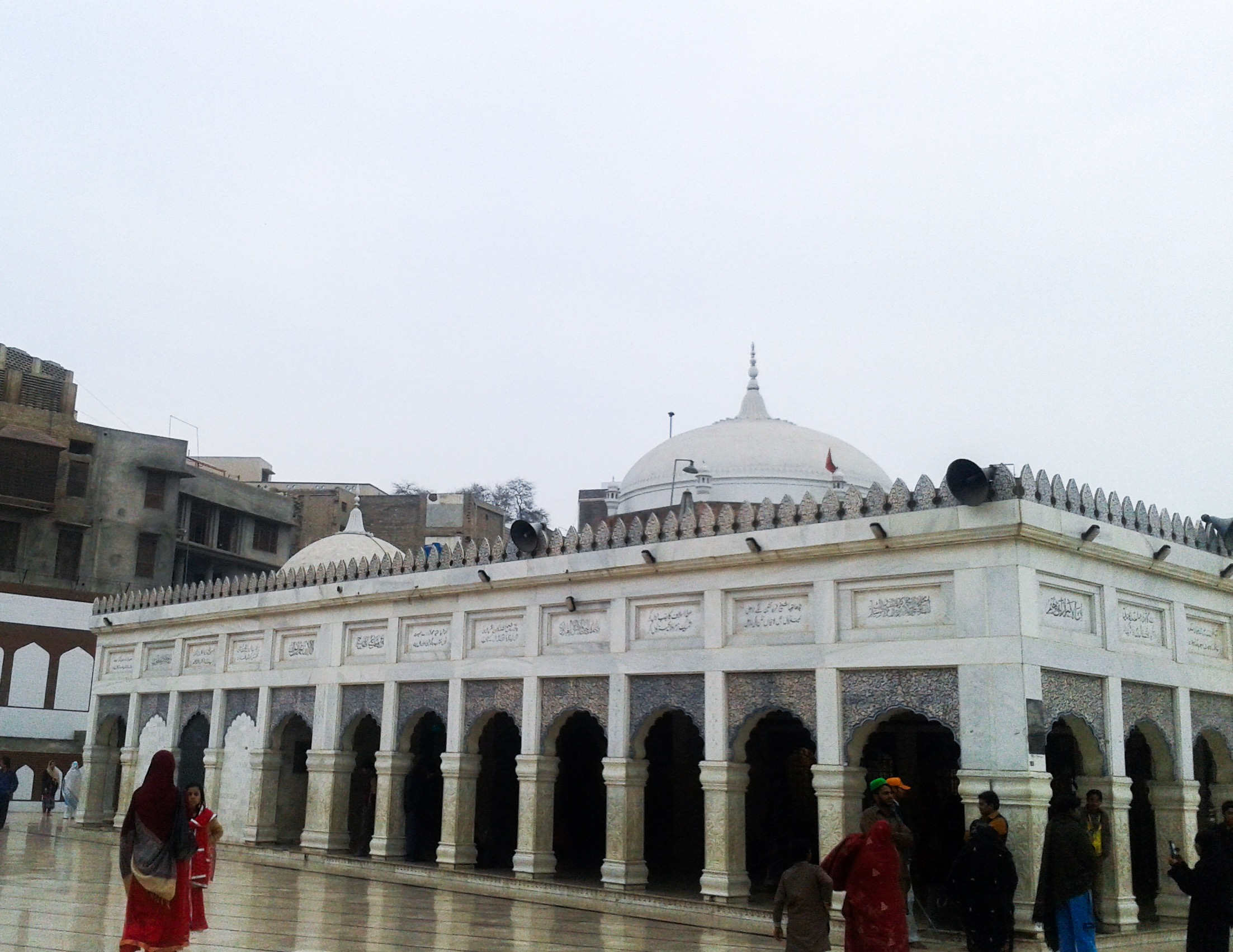
- The shrine of Baba Farid is one of Pakistan's most important Sufi and Sikh shrines

- Location within Punjab, Pakistan Location within Pakistan

Religion
- Affiliation: Sunni Islam
- District: Pakpattan
- Province: Punjab
- Year consecrated: 1265

Location
- Location: Pakpattan
- Country: Pakistan
- Coordinates: 30°20′28″N 73°23′15″E

Architecture
- Type: Mosque and Sufi mausoleum

The Shrine of Baba Farid (Punjabi: مزار بابا فرید دا, romanized: Mazār Bābā Farīd Dā; Urdu: بابا فرید درگاہ, romanized: Bābā Farīd Dargāh) is a 13th-century Sufi dargah shrine located in Pakpattan, Punjab, Pakistan dedicated to the Punjabi Sufi mystic and poet Baba Farid. The shrine is one of the most important in Pakistan, and was among the first Islamic holy sites in South Asia – providing the region's Muslims a local focus for devotion. The shrine is also revered by Sikhs, who include Baba Farid's poetry into the Guru Granth Sahib – regarded by Sikhs to be the eternal Guru.

The shrine played a central role in the conversion of locals to Islam over the course of several centuries. Chiefs of the highly revered shrine once controlled a politically autonomous state that was defended by soldiers drawn from local clans that pledged loyalty to the shrine and descendants of Baba Farid. Today the shrine is considered to be the most significant in Punjab, and attracts up to two million visitors to its annual urs festival.

== Location ==
The shrine is located in the town of Pakpattan, in the Pakistani province of Punjab, near the right bank of the Sutlej River.

== Background ==
Turkic settlers had arrived in the region around Pakpattan in the 13th century a result of pressures from the expanding Mongol Empire, and so the city already had a Muslim community with its own mosque by the time of Baba Farid's arrival. Baba Farid established a Jama Khana, or convent, in what was then known as Ajodhan that attracted large masses of devotees who would gather at the convent daily in hopes of securing ta'widh, or written blessings and amulets. Devotees would in turn offer a futuh, or gift to the shrine in return.

By the 13th century, the belief that the spiritual powers of great Sufi saints were attached to their burial sites was widespread in the Muslim world, and so a shrine was built to commemorate the burial site of Baba Farid after he died in 1265.

In keeping with Sufi tradition in Punjab, the shrine maintains influence over smaller shrines throughout the region around Pakpattan that are dedicated to specific events in Baba Farid's life. The secondary shrines form a wilayat, or a "spiritual territory" of the shrine, with Pakpattan serving as the capital of Baba Farid's spiritual territory, or wilayat. The shrine and its wilayat also bound local tribes together with a collective identity based on reverence for the shrine.

== History ==
=== Establishment ===
By the time of Baba Farid's death, the belief that the spiritual powers saints were attached to their burial sites was widespread in the Muslim world, and so following the death of Baba Farid in 1265, a shrine was built at the place of his burial near his convent. The shrine complex eventually grew to encompass not only the tomb itself, but also a mosque, a langar, and several other related buildings.

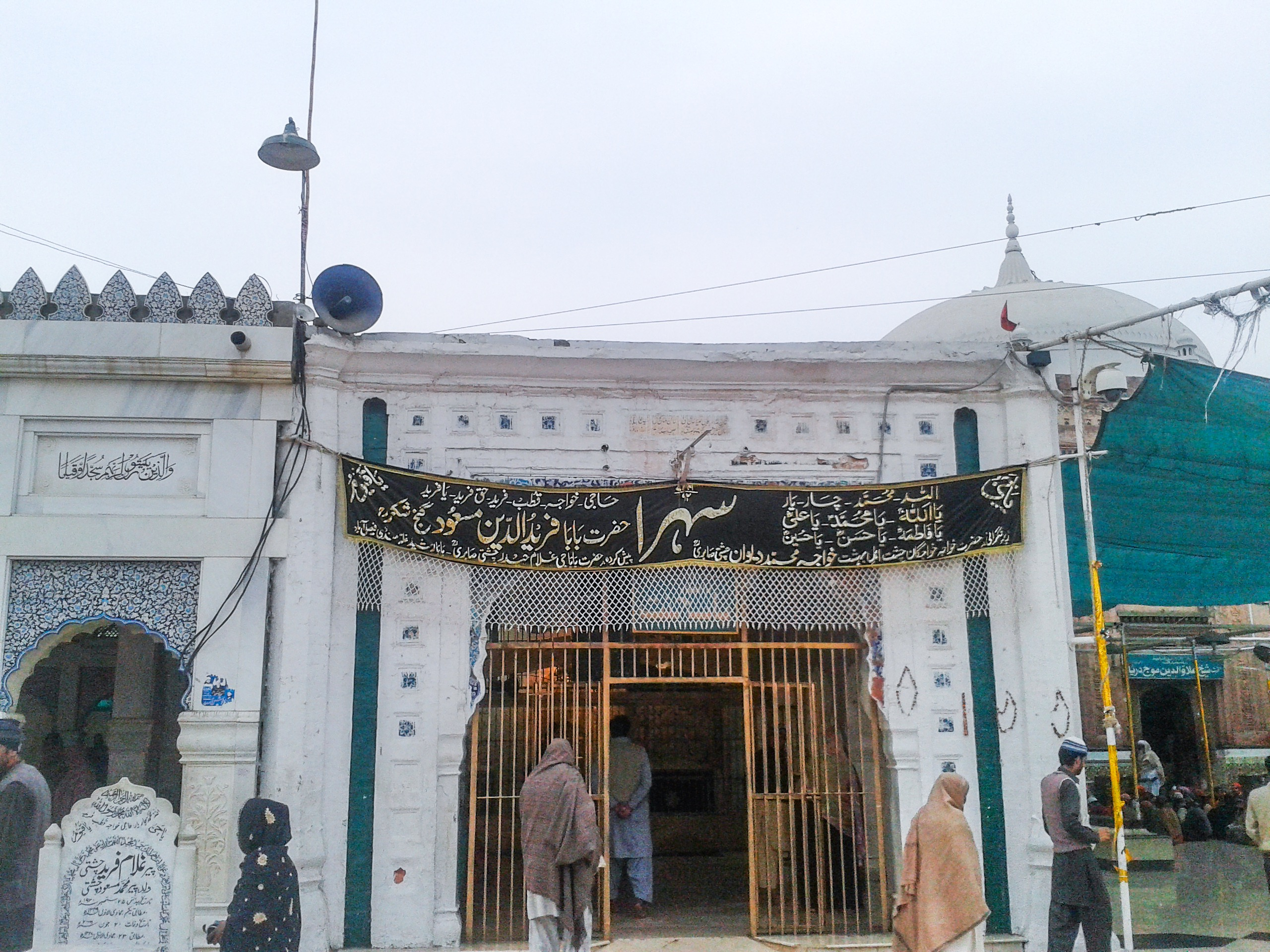
Baba Farid's tomb serves as the epicentre of the activity at the shrine complex.

In 1281, Sheik Ala ad-Din Mauj Darya was appointed as spiritual successor of Baba Farid. Under his authority, the shrine's popularity grew spectacularly, and the countryside around the shrine began to revere the shrine. In 1315, the Sufi mystic Amir Khusrow noted in detail that the 50th anniversary of Baba Farid's death was celebrated by an urs festival which attracted devotees who heard recitations of the saints deeds, and were treated to entertainment by an ensemble of dervishes.

Various secondary shrines devoted to Baba Farid also began to be established around the 14th century that extended the shrine's spiritual territory, or wilayat, though the shrines were built by commoners, rather than royal patrons. The network of shrines defined tracts in Punjab as being areas belonging to the spiritual kingdom of Baba Farid, where spiritual powers of the saint could protect travelers. It was noted that beyond borders of Baba Farid's wilayat lay the wilayat belonging to the Shrine of Bahauddin Zakariya in Multan.

=== Tughluq Sultanate ===
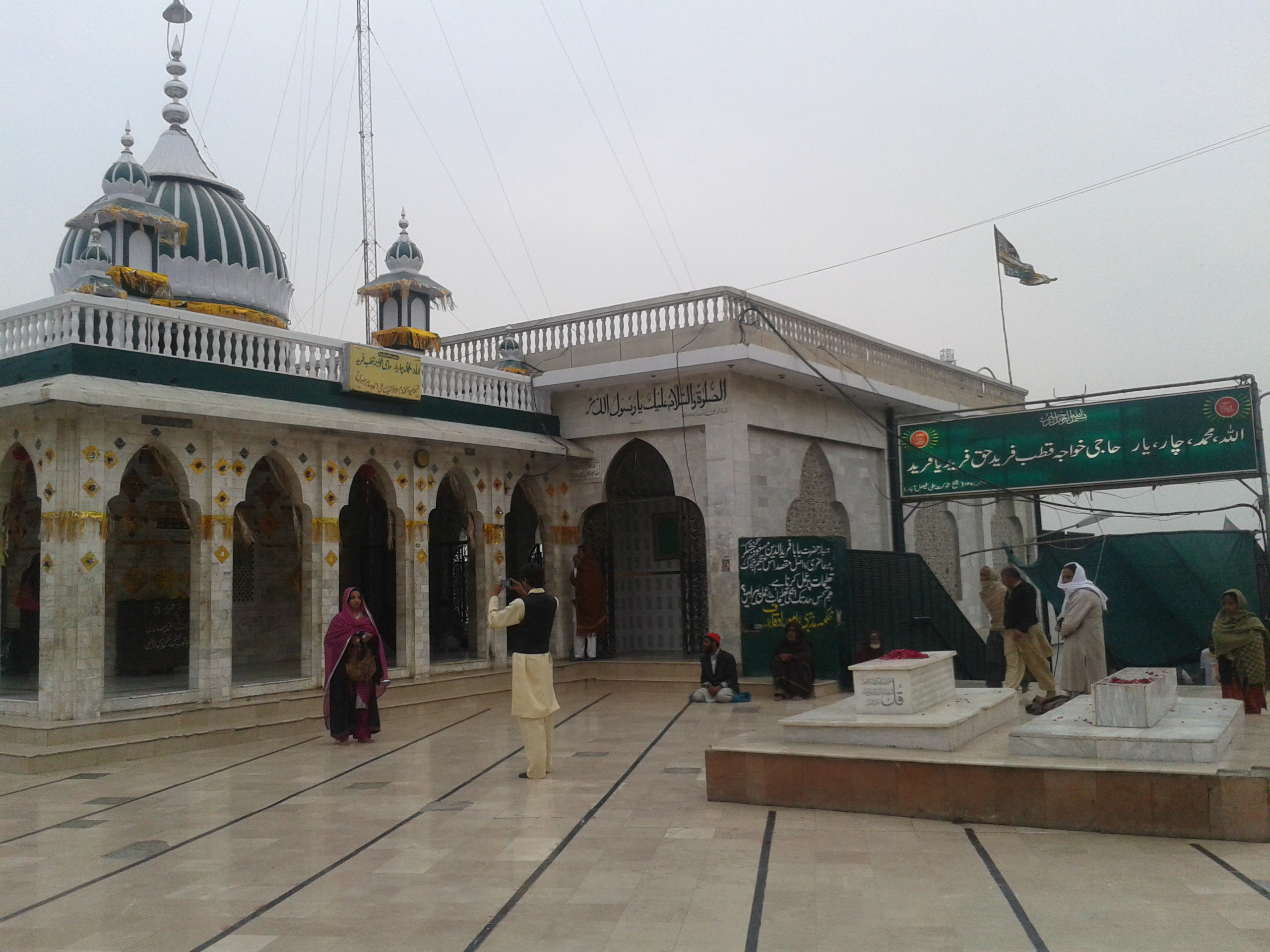
The shrine complex also includes shrines dedicated to the early diwans of the shrine.

The shrine's reputation continued to grow and had spread beyond the border of medieval Islamic India. The shrine was visited by the Arab explorer Ibn Battuta in 1334, who recounted that the Egyptian Shaikh Burhan-ud-dun al-Araj foretold in Alexandria that Ibn Battuta would meet Baba Farid's descendants. Tamerlane seized Pakpattan in 1398, and prayed at the shrine for increased strength. He spared the town's inhabitants out of respect for the shrine.

During the era of the Tughluq dynasty between 1321 and 1398, the shrine received official patronage from the royal court in Delhi after the founder of the dynasty, Ghiyath al-Din Tughluq, became attracted to the "spiritual power" of Mauj Darya.

Ghiyath al-Din Tughluq was noted to have made frequent visits to the shrine when he was Governor of Punjab and ruled from nearby Dipalpur. The 14th century chronicler Shams-i Siraj 'Afif noted that the Governor, and future Sultan, brought his son and nephew, the future Sultans Muhammad bin Tughluq, and Firuz Shah Tughlaq to the shrine, where they participated in the turban-tying ceremony known as dastar bandi, which conferred symbolic authority in a way similar to a coronation ceremony.

Tradition maintains that Muhammad bin Tughluq was a disciple of the shrine's second diwan, Mauj Darya, who had performed the dastar bandi ceremony for Muhammad bin Tughluq. Muhammad wished to construct a fine shrine for his spiritual master Mauj Darya, but the master refused to permit construction until he died. Following Sheik Ala ad-Din's death in 1335, Muhammad bin Tughluq ordered construction of a shrine for him that eventually became one of the finest works of Tughluq architecture, which dwarfed even the tomb of Baba Farid.

Firuz Tughluq undertook repairs at the shrine of Baba Farid in the 14th century, and began to grant robes to honour descendants of Baba Farid. Eventually, subsequent diwans of the shrine became closely associated with the Tughluq court in Delhi, and the shrine began to increasingly rely upon royal patronage. Tamerlane visited the shrine in 1398 during his invasion of northern India.

=== Mughal ===
The founder of Sikhism, Guru Nanak, visited the shrine in the early 1500s to collect compositions of Baba Farid's poetry from Sheikh Ibrahim, the 12th generation descendant of Baba Farid. Mughal Emperor Akbar in 1571 paid his respects at the shrine and implored Baba Farid. Shah Jahan in 1629 issued a royal decree declaring that revenues from the region around Pakpattan would be used for the shrine's upkeep, and that khadims, or "servants", of the shrine would also receive royal support.

=== Chishti ===
Local Caretakers of Baba Farid known as Chishti the shrine's caretakers, and other disciples of the shrine formed an autonomous polity centred on the shrine. Local people would pledge allegiance to the shrine and its caretakers, and were reportedly able to raise an army of 10,000 men to defend the shrine and Chishti.

In 1757, the shrine's army attacked the Raja of Bikaner but were routed. The army of devotees was able to defend the Chishti Emirate against Sikh attacks in 1776. The shrine and its independent state were conquered by the Sikhs in 1810 who further enriched the shrine.

=== Sikh ===
Baba Farid's poetry came to be revered within Sikhism, and was incorporated into the Sikh holy book, the Guru Granth Sahib – the shrine thus assumed importance as a place of Sikh devotion in addition to its function as a Muslim shrine. Maharaja Ranjit Singh of the Sikh Empire captured the shrine in 1810. He later visited the shrine, and pledged an annual sum of 9,000 rupees towards its upkeep. The shrine began to be a centre of contention between the Sikh and Muslim community as a result of joint devotion to the shrine.

=== British ===
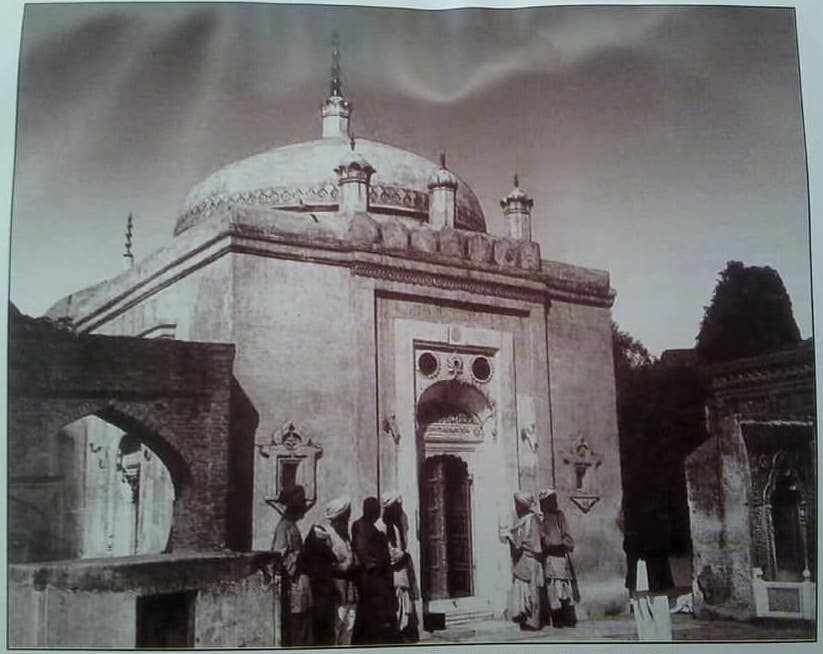
Shrine of Sheikh Fareed Shakarganj photographed in 1928.

British colonial rule over the shrine commenced following the defeat of the Sikh Empire in 1849. The British colonial regime maintained ties with shrine, and sought to employ it towards the goal of "indirect rule" over the region through political and social systems that predated their arrival.

=== Modern era ===
Following the Partition of British India in 1947, the shrine no longer served as a source of intercommunal conflict, and instead began to be identified exclusively as a Muslim shrine. The shrine assumed even greater importance within Pakistan, as Pakistani pilgrims often find it difficult to visit Chisti shrines in Delhi and Ajmer on account of poor relations between Pakistan and India. As a result, Baba Farid's shrine has emerged as the "unrivaled centre" of Chisti Sufism in Pakistan. Though Sikhs and Hindus in India are now largely cut-off from the shrine, commemorations of his annual urs are held in Amritsar.

In April 2001, at least 36 devotees were crushed at a stampede at the shrine as pilgrims rushed towards the Behishti Darwaza at the opening of the annual urs festival, while more than 100 others were reported as injured. Following the September 11 attacks, caretakers of the shrine denounced extremist and exclusivist interpretations of Islam. On 25 October 2010, a bomb exploded outside the gates of the shrine, killing six people. In recent years, the founder and chairman of the Pakistan Tehreek-i-Insaf, former cricketer Imran Khan, has regularly visited the shrine at night.

== Layout ==
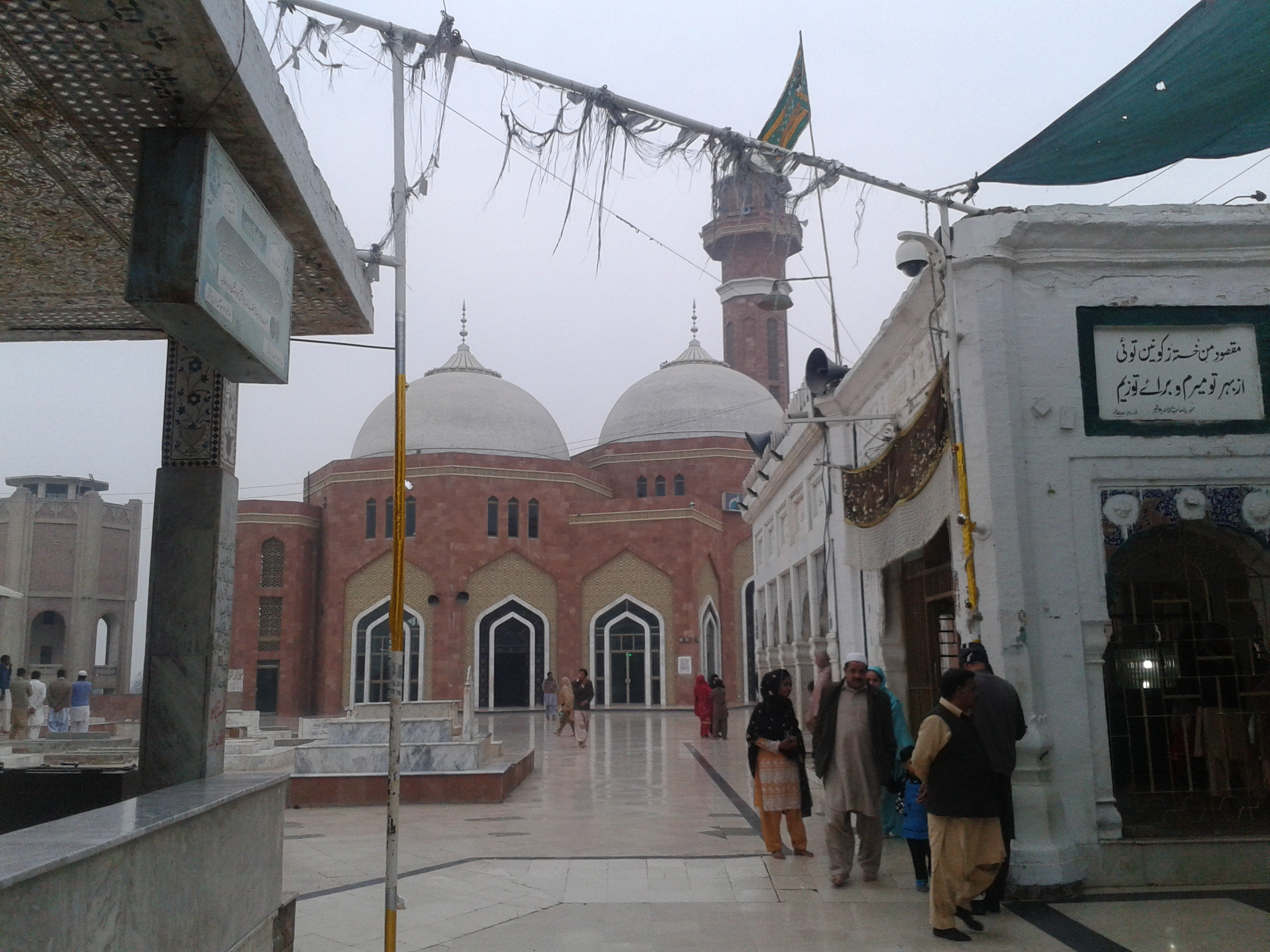
The shrine complex includes a large mosque.

The shrine complex includes not only the tomb of Baba Farid, but also those of his hereditary successors. The complex also includes the site of the city's old mosque which predated Baba Farid's arrival to the city. The small tomb of Baba Farid is made of white marble with two doors – one facing east named the Nūrī Darwāza or 'Gate of Light', and another facing south named the Bahishtī Darwāza, or 'Gate of Paradise'.

A long covered corridor surrounds much of the building. Inside the mausoleum are two white marbled graves – one belonging to Baba Farid, and the other to his eldest son. The space inside the tomb space is limited; not more than ten people can be inside at one time. The building is not segregated by gender, but an area exists that is exclusively for use of women.

== Significance ==
=== Sufism ===
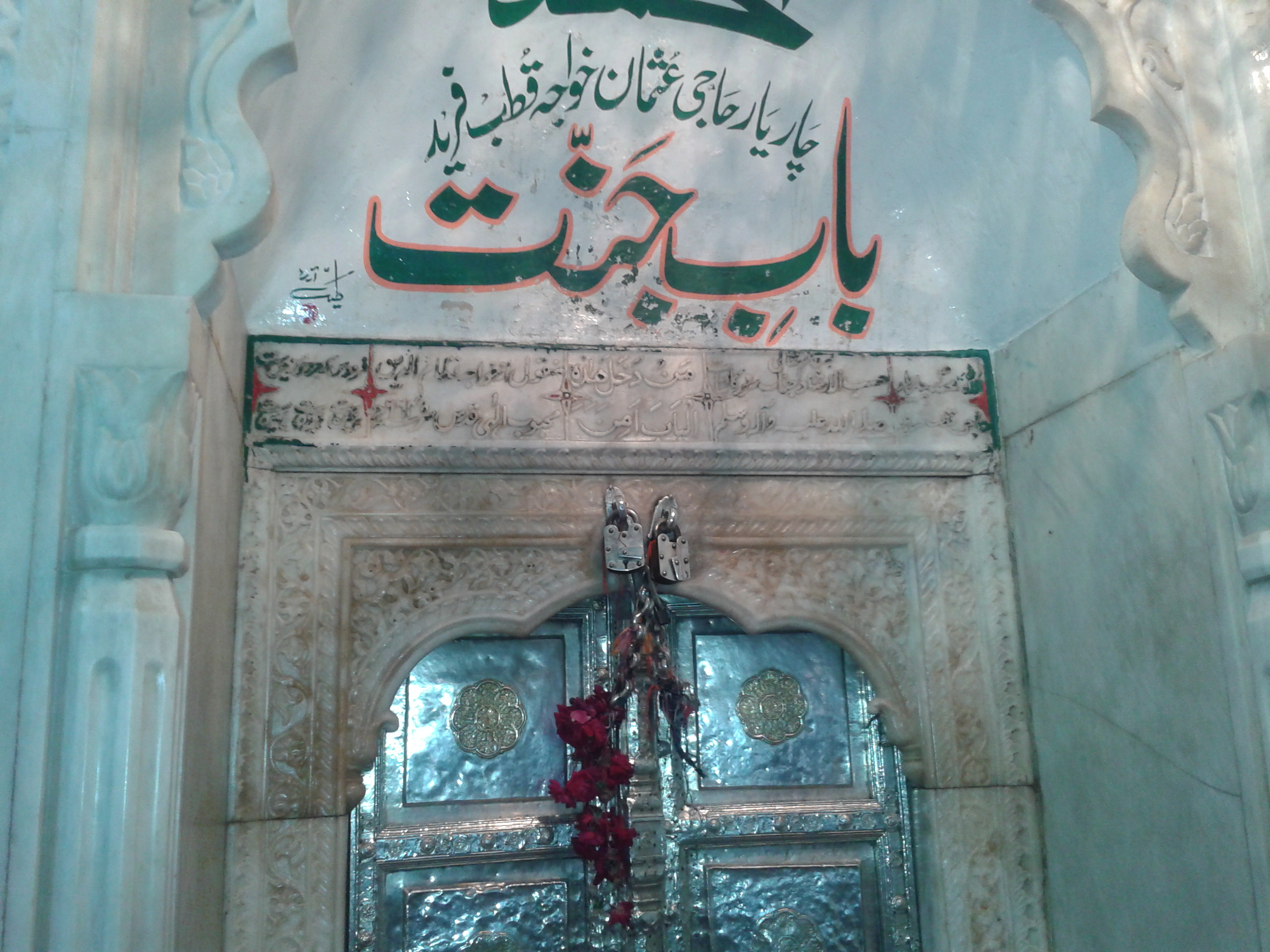
The shrine's Bab-e-Jannat portal into the shrine's innermost sanctum represents a symbolic gateway to paradise.

The Chishti Order of Sufism was the first great Sufi order to take root in the capital of medieval Islamic India, Delhi. The shrine, along with the Chisti Ajmer Sharif Dargah and Nizamuddin Dargah, were the first to be established within Islamic India. The trio of shrines allowed local Muslims for the first time to access to Islamic holy sites without having to journey to the Middle East.

Built in the town that was known in medieval times as Ajodhan, the old town's importance was eclipsed by that of the shrine, as evidenced by its renaming to "Pakpattan", meaning "Pure Ferry" – referencing a river crossing made by pilgrims to the shrine. The shrine was central to a process which resulted in the conversion of local Jat tribes to Islam over the course of several centuries.

=== Sikhism ===
Baba Farid's poetry was incorporated into the Sikh holy book, the Guru Granth Sahib – and so the shrine assumed importance as a place of Sikh devotion in addition to its function as a Muslim shrine. Maharaja Ranjit Singh of the Sikh Empire captured the shrine in 1810. He later visited the shrine, and pledged an annual sum of 9,000 Rupees towards its upkeep. The shrine began to be a centre of contention between the Sikh and Muslim community as a result of joint devotion to the shrine.

=== Political ===
The shrine has since been a key factor shaping Pakpattan's politics. Patronage from the Tughluq royal court began during the life of the second diwan Mauj Darya, and subsequent diwans became increasingly associated with the Tughluq court – the third diwan of the shrine, Mu'izz ad-Din was even placed in government service in Gujarat by Muhammad Tughluq, while his brother was deemed "Shaikh ul-Islam" of India.

Shah Jahan in 1692 issued a farman, or royal decree, that descendants of Baba Farid known as be extended support from the Mughal court. The number of descendants was so large, that they formed a new class of landowners in the region around Pakpattan who were privileged relative to the agricultural clans that were found in the area. The new class of landowning descendants of Baba Farid became known as the Chisti, who were patronized by rulers in Delhi in order to extend Delhi's sovereignty over Punjab.

The shrine's hereditary caretakers, or diwan, eventually began to assert themselves as political administrators by operating a network of forts and devotee-soldiers. The religious duties of the diwan became increasingly fulfilled by a network of preachers and "subordinate religious specialists", while the diwan focused efforts at administration of the Pakpattan city-state.

British colonialists in the late 19th century noted that the Chisti were influential, but relied entirely on tenant farmers from local agricultural clans. Chistis are reported to have owned 9% of all land in Montgomery District in the late 19th century.

Local agricultural clans remained loyal to the Chisti descendants of the shrine, and swore spiritual allegiance to the Chisti descendants of Baba Farid, rather than to Baba Farid himself. Clans would offer brides to the Chisti clan in a mark of allegiance to the Chisti. Over time, the clans became to closely associated themselves with both the shrine, and Diwan.

==== Autonomous state ====
The oath of allegiance also included a pledge to militarily defend the shrine and the Chisti. The Khokars, Bhattis, Dhudhis, and Hans clans at were reportedly able to raise an army of 10,000 men to defend the shrine and Chisti if needed. In 1757, the shrine's diwan Abd as-Subhan raised an army from the clans in order to attack the Raja of Bikaner, and was able to extend the shrines territory to the opposite bank of the Sutlej River. The army of devotees was able to repel a Sikh attack against Pakpattan in 1776, resulting in the death of Heera Singh Sandhu, founder of the Sikh Nakai Misl state. The shrines cavalries were able to pursue retreating Sikh soldiers, killing several thousand more.

== Practices ==
=== Charity ===
Gifts and donations to the shrine are redistributed to other devotees, in a practice that follows Baba Farid's example. Baba Farid's shrine subsequently became a centre of wealth redistribution throughout the western Punjab. The shrine maintains a langar, or canteen, which serves free meals to the poor.

=== Adab traditions ===
A system of elaborate rituals developed around the shrine that integrated local clans into the social and religious structure of the shrine. A 1623 collection of biographies regarding Baba Farid's life, the Jawahir al-Faridi, noted that the shrine's major rituals had in fact been established during Badr ad-Din's position of diwan that was inherited immediately following Baba Farid's death.

Such traditions included the tying of a turban (dastar bandi) to signify inheritance of Baba Farid's spiritual authority, the regularization of qawwali music, establishment of the shrine's free kitchen, and opening of the tomb's southern door to allow visitors to the urs festival to directly pass the shrine's most sacred area. Devotees would also pass through the shrine's Beheshti Darwaza in order to symbolically enter paradise.

Pilgrims regarded the ferry journey across the Sutlej River towards the shrine as a metaphorical journey of salvation in a boat piloted by the saint, in a ritual that may echo the Hindu concept of tirtha, or crossing of a river ford from the mundane into the spiritual world.

A system of social hierarchy developed as a result of the shrine's Adab. The diwan and his family were considered the most important, followed by the shrine's khalifas, members of the Chisti class, chiefs of local agricultural clans.

== Shrine guardianship ==
By the 13th century, a widespread belief had taken root in Muslim societies that a Sufi saint's spiritual powers could be inherited by his descendants. Upon the death of Baba Farid, his son Badr ad-Din Sulaiman was deemed to be Baba Farid's prime successor, setting a pattern of hereditary acquisition of the position. The successorship of Badr ad-Din's son, Shaikh Ala ad-Din Mauj Darya, in 1281 further cemented this tradition.

The chief caretaker and spiritual authority of most shrines is typically referred to as a sajjada nashin, though at Baba Farid's shrine, the title for the position in taken from the royal courts of medieval Islamic India, and is instead referred to as diwan. The diwan is traditionally believed to inherit the baraka, or spiritual power, of Baba Farid. The diwan of the Pakpattan shrine historically has not maintained spiritual authority in the region by himself – rather, the shrine's authority was also spread among a baradari, or network of Baba Farid's descendants that lived in the regions surrounding the shrine, who in turn were sometimes themselves sajjada nashins of small shrine dedicated to pious descendants of Baba Farid. Members of the baradari were often owned large tracts of land granted to them by various rulers, or were local village officials. By the 19th and 20th centuries, the network of sajjada nashins in the Baba Farid wilayat maintained a network of authority that paralleled the region's official administrative system.

The success of each diwan or sajjada nashin was tied to his ability to attract official patronage and increase donations, in order to further promote the shrine's prestige, and to distribute among subsidiary shrines located in the region surrounding Pakpattan. Resources directed towards subsidiary shrines were used to maintain social services, such as the langar which served free meals to the poor. Hospitality provided at the langar further heightened the status of a Sajjada nashin.

=== Diwan succession ===
Appointment of a successor for the hereditary title required "revelation" from Baba Farid's spirit to determine the inheritor of his baraka, or blessed direct access to God. Selection of the inheritor was supported by consent from Baba Farid's committed devotees, and members of the baradari network of shrines.

==== Conflicts over succession ====
Conflict over succession sometimes occurred – in the 1880s during British colonial rule, those in dispute appealed to the British court system to determine which claimant had inherited revelation from Baba Farid, though the court based its decision on deference to historic customs in determining the successor.

During the 1880s and 1890s, the shrine's diwan switched three times in the course of deliberations – though attendance at the shrine did not decline, and it did not appear that devotees particularly cared which person served in the role. The eventual successful petitioner, Sayid Muhammad was not considered a learned religious scholar. Erosion of the diwan's spiritual role resulted in criticism of the entire shrine system by Muslim reformist movements in the 20th century.

At the time of Sayid Muhammad's death in 1934, another crisis over inheritance erupted as some members of the shrine's baradari bodies disputed the succession of a minor, Ghulam Qutb ad-Din, to the role which they argued was inappropriate to be filled by a young man. British Courts accepted Ghulam Qutb ad-Din as the next successor, and established a caretaker system for the shrine until he reached maturity, and arranged for his training and education at Lahore's prestigious Aitchison College – a plan which was met with resistance by members of the baradari who feared that an education there would signal the diwan's integration into the British values system, rather than that of Islam. British attempts at resolution were seen as interference in the shrine's religious affairs, and eroded the legitimacy of the shrine's diwan system.

== Administration ==
The shrine is administered by the Auqaf Department. The shrine is open 24 hours a day for visitors, every day of the year.

== Controversy of Bahishtī Darwāza ==
In 2018, on the occasion of annual urs celebration of Baba Farid, the police commissioner of Sahiwal District was invited by the administrative team of the shrine. As per the regulations of the shrine, the Bahishtī Darwāza is usually opened by the local police commissioner but at the same time, the shrine administration does not allow women to trespass the Bahishtī Darwāza. The shrine's administrative team therefore instructed the lady police commissioner to bring along a male police guard who will open the Bahishtī Darwāza. By violating the shrine's laws and regulations, the lady police commissioner opened the Bahishtī Darwāza along with a female District Police Officer. The said act of violation created more complications and the police department later on suspended and transferred the female police commissioner.

== Baba Fareed Urs Ritual ==
The 781st annual 10-day rituals at the shrine of Baba Fariduddin Ganj Shakar began here on Tuesday at Pakpattan.

== See also ==
- List of mausolea and shrines in Pakistan
- Sufism in Pakistan
