= Hussaini Brahmin =

Mohyal Brahmin community of the Punjab-region

Hussaini Brahmins
Regions with significant populations
- India: Delhi, Chandigarh, Punjab, Himachal Pradesh, Jammu Pakistan: Sindh, Chakwal, Lahore, Afghanistan: Kabul, southern regions

Languages
- Hindi, Gujarati, Urdu

Religion
- Syncretized Islam and Hinduism

Related ethnic groups
- Mohyal Brahmins, Saraswat Brahmins

Hussaini Brahmins are a small sect within the Mohyal Brahmin community of the Punjab region.

The Mohyal community normally associated with orthodox Brahmins comprises seven sub-clans named Bali, Bhimwal, Chhibber, Datt, Lau, Mohan and Vaid.

They have adopted non-Brahmanical traditions leading to the sub-set of the Moyhal community paying reverence to Islam, most notably to the third Imam Hussain.

According to V. Upadhyaya they were influenced by the Chisti Sufis. While they wear the yajnopavita and the tilak, they take alms from only the Muslims, and not from Hindus. Some of them are found in Pushakar, Ajmer, where Mu'in al-Din Chishti is buried. According to another tradition, Yazid's troops had brought Imam Husain's head to their ancestors home in Sialkot. In exchange for his head, the ancestor exchanged his own sons' heads. Famous Hussaini Brahmins include the actor Sunil Dutt, Urdu writers Kashmiri Lal Zakir, Sabir Dutt, and Nand Kishore Vikram.

Few families can still be found in parts of Iraq but most families of Hussaini Brahmins are now settled in Pune, Delhi, Chandigarh, Punjab, Himachal Pradesh and Jammu region in India. Sindh, Chakwal and Lahore in Pakistan and Kabul and South Afghanistan in Afghanistan. Some of them also observe Muharram every year.

== History ==
As per Mohyal oral history, a Mohyal Brahmin of the Dutt clan had fought on behalf of Imam al-Husayn in the Battle of Karbala (680 C.E.), more specifically in the storming of Kufa—sacrificing his seven sons in the process. According to legend, Rahab Sidh Dutt (also mentioned as Rahib Sidh or Sidh Viyog Datt in some versions) was the leader of a small band of career-soldiers living near Baghdad around the time of the battle of Karbala. The legend mentions the place where he stayed as Dair-al-Hindiya, meaning "The Indian Quarter", which matches an Al-Hindiya in existence today.

== Notable Figures ==
- Maj. General G. D. Bakshi - Retired Major General of Indian Army, leading defence analyst of India

== Other ==
In Ajmer, Rajasthan, a place of Sufi pilgrimage, where Moinuddin Chishti lived and passed his last days, there is even today a class of people who call themselves Hussaini Brahmins, who are neither 'orthodox Hindus' nor orthodox Muslims. Hussaini Brahmins practiced a mixed blend of orthodox Vedic and Islamic traditions. A saying in Hindi/Urdu language refers to the Hussaini Brahmans thus: "Wah Datt Sultan, Hindu ka dharm, Musalman ka Iman, Adha Hindu adha Musalman" (Well Datt Sultan, declaring Hindu Dharma and following Muslim practice, Half Hindu and Half Muslim.

== See also ==
- Punjabi Hindus
- Mohyal Brahmins
- Ganga-Jamuni tehzeeb
- Hindu–Islamic relations
- Hindu–Muslim unity
- Religious syncretism
