= Mahan Singh Hazarawala =

Governor of Hazara
- In office 1837–1838
- Monarch: Ranjit Singh
- Preceded by: Hari Singh Nalwa
- Succeeded by: Tej Singh

Personal details
- Died: 1844 Hazara, Sikh Empire
- Parent: Data Ram Bali (Father)
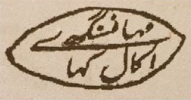
- Signature

Mahan Singh Hazarawala (died 1844) was a military officer in the Khalsa Army of Sikh Empire, serving under Hari Singh Nalwa.

== Early life ==
Mahan Singh was born into a Punjabi Hindu family from the Bali clan of Mohyal Brahmins. He was the son of Data Ram Bali, a trusted servant of Sultan Muqarrab Khan, the Muslim Gakhar chief of the city of Gujrat.

== Military career ==
While in Lahore in search of a job, he happened to participate in a hunting expedition of Maharaja Ranjit Singh, in which he caught the notice of the Maharaja by single-handedly killing a leopard with his sword. Impressed by his valor, the Maharaja had him inducted into the army under Hari Singh Nalwa.

Mahan Singh served in the battles of Peshawar and Kashmir, and in the 1818 siege of Multan, where he was wounded twice. In April 1837, he was the main defender of the Jamrud Fort, holding out against an invasion by the Afghans during the Battle of Jamrud. Nalwa was killed in that battle but Mahan Singh kept the news secret until reinforcements arrived from Lahore.

== Death ==
Mahan Singh succeeded Hari Singh as the Diwan of Hazara, where he was killed in 1844 by his own soldiers when a mutiny broke out.

== See also ==
- Maharaja Ranjit Singh's Generals
- Mansehra
