= Mangal Singh Ramgarhia =

Sikh warrior

Sardar Bawaqar Mangal Singh Ramgarhia CSI
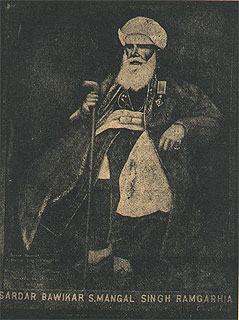
- Sardar Mangal Singh Ramgarhia seated, adoring the CSI

Sarbarah
- In office 1862–1879
- Preceded by: Jodh Singh
- Succeeded by: Man Singh Waraich

Personal details
- Born: 1800 Sikh Empire (present-day Punjab, India)
- Died: 1879
- Relations: Jassa Singh Ramgarhia
- Parent: Diwan Singh (father)

Sardar Bawaqar Mangal Singh Ramgarhia CSI (1800–1879) was a Sikh veteran of the First and Second Anglo-Sikh wars who served as the manager of Darbar Sahib and the Akal Takht, as a sarbarah appointed by the British Raj from 1862 to 1879. He held the title of "Sardar-i-Bawaqar" (the Sardar with Prestige).

== Biography ==
Mangal Singh was the son of Diwan Singh and grandson of Tara Singh Ramgarhia, brother of the Sikh leader Jassa Singh Ramgarhia. He was heir to some of the estates of Jassa Singh's son Jodh Singh. In 1834, he was sent to Peshawar to command 400 foot soldiers and 110 sawars (cavalrymen) of the old Ramgarhia clan. There, under Tej Singh and Hari Singh Nalwa, he fought in the Battle of Jamrud in April 1837.

During the reign of Sher Singh, Mangal Singh was employed in Suket, Mandi and Kullu, remaining there until the end of the Satluj War in 1846. During the Second Anglo-Sikh War, Mangal Singh was noted for his work in guarding the roads and maintaining order in the districts of Amritsar and Gurdaspur. After Punjab came under British rule, he retired to Amritsar, where he died in 1879.

== Honours ==
- Sarbarah of Darbar Sahib and the Akal Takht (1862–1879)
- Honorary Magistrate of Amritsar (1862-1879)
- Member of Vice-Regal Durbar (1864)
- Companions of the Star of India (1876)
