= Battle of Jamrud =

1837 battle of the Afghan–Sikh Wars

- Part of the Afghan–Sikh Wars
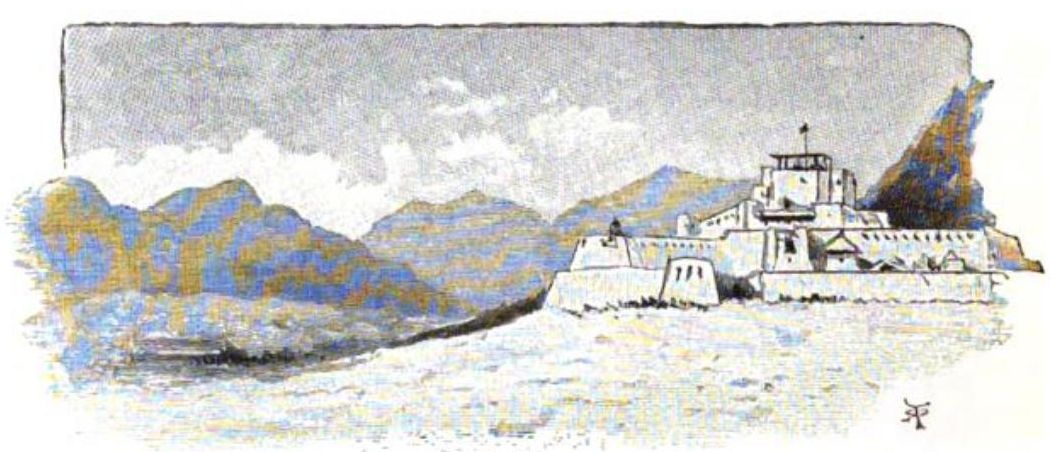
- A portrait of the Jamrud Fort
Date	30 April 1837
Location	Jamrud, Sikh Empire; Modern day Khyber Agency 34.0034°N 71.3786°E
Result	Disputed

Belligerents
Emirate of Kabul	Sikh Empire

Commanders and leaders
Akbar Khan; Afzal Khan; Shams Khan; Sami Khan	Hari Singh †; Mahan Singh; Mangal Singh; Tej Singh Italian Mercenaries: Paolo Avitabile

Strength
7,000 cavalry 2,000 matchlockmen 9,000 guerilla fighters 20,000 Khybers; 50 guns	600–800 Jamrud garrison 10,000 relief force/reinforcements

Casualties and losses
Grewal: 11,000 Afghans; Gupta: 7,000 Afghans	Grewal: 6,000 Sikhs; Gupta: 7,000 Sikhs
- Location within Pakistan

The Battle of Jamrud was fought between the forces of the Emirate of Afghanistan under Wazir Akbar Khan, and the Sikh Empire under Maharaja Ranjit Singh on 30 April 1837. The Afghans confronted the Sikh forces at Jamrud. The garrisoned army was able to hold off the Afghans until Sikh reinforcements arrived from Lahore to relieve them.

== Background ==
Following the consolidation of the Sikh Empire in Punjab, Maharaja Ranjit Singh had led a wave of invasions on Afghan-held territories, also capitalizing off of the Afghan civil war and began conquering the long-held Afghan territories over the preceding years. This resulted in the Durrani Empire losing the Punjab region, Multan, Kashmir, Derajat, Hazara, Balakot and Attock, whereas Peshawar and Jamrud would later be seized from the Peshawar Sardars in 1834.

== Prelude and battle ==
Towards the end of 1836, Sardar Hari Singh Nalwa, the commander-in-chief of the Sikh Khalsa Army, attacked and captured the small, but very strategic, fortified Khyberi village of Jamrud, situated on the south side of a range of mountains at the mouth of the Khyber Pass. With the conquest of Jamrud, the Sikh Empire now bordered the frontier of Afghanistan. In 1837, the Sikh Army was in Lahore where all their best generals and troops were recalled from across the Sikh Empire including Peshawar for the wedding of Kanwar Nau Nihal Singh, the grandson of Maharaja Ranjit Singh. The Emir of Afghanistan, Dost Mohammad Khan, finding this as the right opportunity, sent his sons with a 7,000 cavalry, 2,000 matchlock-equipped men, 9,000 guerilla fighters and 20,000 Khybers. Akbar Khan reached Jamrud, and saw no sign of the Sikh forces, and as a result began to demolish the defenses of the fort. While Akbar Khan's forces were focused on destroying the fortifications, Hari Singh Nawla, the Sikh general, led a charge against the Afghans. The Afghans were sent into disarray with heavy losses, and Akbar Khan's force was relieved by Shams al-Din Khan, who charged the Sikh lines. Akbar Khan reorganized and rallied his men and forced the Sikhs to retreat to the fort of Jamrud. Amidst the fighting, Nalwa was mortally injured in the battle and later died after forcing his way into the fort. According to Afghan chronicle Siraj al-Tawarikh, Akbar Khan and Hari Singh Nawla engaged in a duel without recognizing each other. After much thrusting and parrying, Akbar Khan won out and Nawla was knocked to the ground and killed. According to historian Hari Ram Gupta, when Hari Singh rallied his men and rode to the front, he was struck by two bullets, one in the stomach and the other on the side. Mortally wounded he was immediately taken inside the fort where he ordered that his death be kept a secret till reinforcements arrived. Many eyewitnesses claimed Nalwa ordered his dead body to be hung outside the fort before he died, discouraging the Afghans from attacking, believing Nalwa was still alive. The Sikh garrison continued holding out until Sikh reinforcements arrived from Lahore, prompting the Afghans to retire from the siege. The battle ended with the retreat of Afghans back to Jalalabad.

== Result of the battle ==
The result of the battle is disputed amongst historians. Some contend the failure of the Afghans to take the fort and the city of Peshawar or town of Jamrud as a victory for the Sikhs. However, historians such as Christine Noelle state that Dost Mohammad Khan held no real ambitions for taking Peshawar in 1837. On the other hand, some sources state that the killing of Hari Singh Nalwa resulted in an Afghan victory. James Norris, Professor of Political Science at Texas A&M International University, states that the battle's outcome was inconclusive.

== Aftermath ==
To defuse the situation, Dost Mohammad wrote an apology letter to the Maharaja claiming his sons actions were unauthorized and sent some horses as gifts to him. Dost Mohammed Khan claimed: "I have always regarded myself as established by your authority... I was your servant." Dost Mohammed Khan proposed that, if the Sikh Empire would entrust Peshawar to his care, frontier tensions could be alleviated. Yet he warned that if his demand was not heeded, he would be forced by necessity to resort to arms. However the Sikh Durbar turned down the plea for Peshawar and issued a warning, stating that the preservation of peace was not the Afghans monopoly.

On the Sikh side, Ranjit Singh realized that his policies in the northwest frontier had failed to produce the desired results. In an attempt to bring stability to the region, the government of Peshawar was reorganized. The valley was divided between a number of Sikh-appointed governors and tribal chiefs. General Paolo Avitabile was made the new governor of Peshawar, while the surrounding districts were granted to the Barakzai Sardars and local chieftains. A strong Sikh garrison was kept at the newly constructed fort of Shabkadar for maintaining control over the border.

== See also ==
- Battle of Attock
- Siege of Multan (1818)
- Battle of Shopian
- Battle of Nowshera
- Battle of Peshawar (1834)

== Sources ==
- Lee, Jonathan (2019), Afghanistan: A History from 1260 to the Present, Reaktion Books, ISBN 9781789140101
- Singh, Khushwant (2004). A History of the Sikhs: 1469-1838 (2, illustrated, reprint ed.). Oxford University Press. ISBN 9780195673081.
