= List of historical Sikh generals =

This article presents a list of pre-colonial Sikh generals throughout history from the Akal Sena to the Sikh Khalsa Army.

== Akal Sena ==
This is a list of generals from the period of the Akal Sena.

=== Guru Hargobind's generals ===
- Baba Gurditta
- Tyag Mal
- Baba Praga
- Bhai Bidhi Chand
- Bhai Singha Purohit
- Bhai Parasram
- Bhai Lakhi Das
- Bhai Jati Mall/Malik Purohit
- Rai Jodh
- Rai Mandan Rathore
- Rai Ballu
- Bhai Jattu Das
- Bhai Saktu
- Bhai Nanu
- Bhai Banno
- Bhai Kalyana
- Bhai Peda Das
- Bhai Mukand Ram
- Bhai Pirana
- Bhai Jagannath
- Bhai Desa
- Bhai Mohan
- Bhai Mokal
- Bhai Mehar Chand
- Bhai Kirat Bhatt
- Bhai Mathura Bhatt
- Bhai Balu Bhatt
- Bhai Sona Bhatt
- Bhai Sohela Bhatt
- Bhai Sukha Bhatt
- Bhai Fateh Chand Bhatt
- Bhai Amiya Bhatt

=== Guru Har Rai's generals ===
- Bhai Amar Chand
- Bhai Gaura
- Bhai Lakhi Das
- Bhai Jati Malik Purohit

== Khalsa Fauj ==
This is a list of generals from the period of the Khalsa Fauj.

=== Guru Gobind Singh's generals ===
- Bhai Daya Singh
- Bhai Mokham Singh
- Bhai Sahib Singh
- Bhai Himmat Singh
- Bhai Dharam Singh
- Sahibzada Ajit Singh
- Sahibzada Jujhar Singh
- Sahibzada Zorawar Singh Palit
- Bhai Daya Singh Purohit
- Bhai Jati Malik
- Bhai Lal Singh
- Bhai Kirpa Singh
- Bhai Sanmukh Singh
- Bhai Jiwan Singh
- Bhai Tehil Singh
- Bhai Fateh Singh
- Bhai Ishar Singh
- Bhai Ram Singh
- Bhai Deva Singh
- Bhai Udai Singh
- Bhai Nahar Singh
- Bhai Sher Singh
- Bhai Bachittar Singh
- Bhai Mani Singh
- Bhai Mahan Singh
- Bibi Bhag Kaur
- Bibi Deep Kaur
- Peer Buddhan Shah
- Jarnail Kale Khan

== Dal Khalsa ==
This is a list of generals from the period of the Dal Khalsa under the Sikh Confederacy.

- Bhai Bota Singh
- Bhai Garja Singh
- Bhai Mehtab Singh
- Bhai Sukha Singh
- Mata Sahib Kaur
- Bhai Gurbaksh Singh
- Jathedar Binod Singh
- Jathedar Darbara Singh
- Pandit Ran Singh Pada
- Sultan-Al-Quam Nawab Kapur Singh
- Khushal Singh
- Budh Singh
- Bhuma Singh Dhillon
- Hari Singh Dhillon
- Gulab Singh Khatri
- Sahib Singh
- Sultan-Al-Quam Jassa Singh Ahluwalia
- Bhag Singh Ahluwalia
- Jassa Singh Ramgharia
- Jodh Singh Ramgharia
- Charat Singh Sukherchakia
- Maha Singh Sukerchakia
- Jai Singh Kanhaiya
- Raja Gurbaksh Singh Kanhaiya
- Rani Sada Kaur
- Phul Singh Sidhu
- Gulab Singh Rathore Dallevala
- Tara Singh Ghaiba
- Heera Singh Sandhu
- Ran Singh Nakai
- Karmo Kaur
- Karora Singh
- Sangat Singh
- Mohar Singh
- Bhai Sudha Singh
- Shaheed Baba Deep Singh
- Shaheed Karam Singh
- Gurbax Singh
- Baghel Singh
- Misr Chhajju Mall Chaudhuri (Kanhaiya Katra)

== Sikh Khalsa Army ==
Under Maharaja Ranjit Singh, the Sikh ruler of Punjab, a large variety of soldiers served as generals of the Sikh Khalsa Army. Though many of these generals were Sikhs, many others hailed from a diversity of clans, castes, and regions.

- Sardar Hari Singh Nalwa
- Raja Mahan Singh Mirpuri
- Dewan Mokham Chand
- Misr Diwan Chand
- Raja Khushal Singh Jamadar
- Diwan Sawan Mal Chopra
- Diwan Mulraj Chopra
- Zorawar Singh Kahluria
- Raja Tej Singh
- Raja Lal Singh
- Raja Gulab Singh
- Wazir Jawahar Singh
- Maharaja Nau Nihal Singh
- Maharaja Kharak Singh
- Maharaja Sher Singh
- Mehta Basti Ram
- Sher Singh Attariwalla
- Sham Singh Attariwala
- Chattar Singh Attariwalla
- Ranjodh Singh Majithia
- Jathedar Akali Phula Singh
- Chandu Lal Malhotra
- Budh Singh Sandhanwalia
- Ajit Singh Sandhawalia
- Raja Fateh Singh Ahluwalia
- Kahan Singh Nakai
- Sardar Sangat Singh Saini
- Hukma Singh Chimni
- Veer Singh Jallaha
- Jarnail Ghaus Khan
- Ilahi Bakhsh
- Fakir Azzizuddin
- Sultan Mahmud Khan
- Jean-Baptiste Ventura
- Alexander Gardner
- Jean-François Allard
- Raja Ram Singh Pathania
- Sardar Kishan Singh
- Sardar Ram Singh
- Raja Gurdit Singh
- Raja Ajit Singh
- Misr Sukh Raj
- Misr Tarlok Chand
- Misr Badrinath
- Lehna Singh Sandhawalia
- Diwan Khan Chand Kakar
- Mazhar Ali
- Muhammad Khan Zufar
- Naziruddin Illahi
- Mian Ghausa
- Imam Ali Shah
- Claude Augustus Courte
- Pablo Di Avitable
- Oms
- Joshiah Harlan
- Honignberger
- Henry Steinbach
- Charles Van Cordant
- Arjan Singh Ranghar
- Karam Singh Ranghar
- Jawala Singh Padhania
- Mit Singh Padhania
- Gurmukh Singh Lamba
- Gulab Singh Pahuwindia
- Desa Singh Majithia
- Dal Singh Bharania
- Diwan Singh Mann
- Fateh Singh Mann
- Mehtab Singh Bhinder
- Joga Singh Badesha
- Gulab Singh Bhagowalia
