= Capture of Peshawar (1834) =

Battle between the Sikh Empire and the Peshawar Barakzai Sardars

- Part of Afghan–Sikh Wars
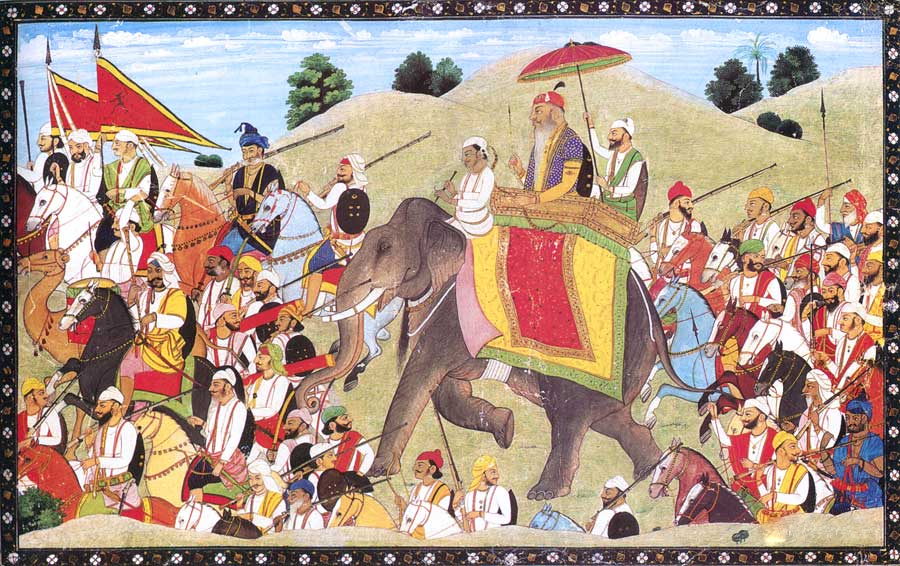
- Military procession of Hari Singh Nalwa
Date	6 May 1834
Location	Peshawar
Result	Sikh victory
Territorial changes	Peshawar became part of the Sikh Empire

Belligerents
Sikh Empire; Italian Mercenaries	Peshawar sardars

Commanders and leaders
Hari Singh; Ranjit Singh; Mahan Singh; Khushal Singh; Tej Singh; Misr Raj Italian Mercenaries : Jean-Baptiste Ventura; Paolo Avitabile	Sultan Mohammad Khan

The city of Peshawar was formally annexed on 6 May 1834 by the Sikh Empire. Peshawar was being governed by the Barakzai Sardars — Yar Mohammed Khan, Sultan Mohammed Khan, Sayeed Mohammed Khan and Pir Mohammed Khan. They were collectively referred to as the Peshawar Barakzais. The Peshawar Barakzais had broken free of their half-brothers ruling Kabul.

Charles Masson, pseudonym of a deserter from the army of The East India Company, was an eyewitness to the event and has left a detailed account.

== Capture of the city ==
Following the collapse of the Durrani Empire, Afghanistan split into many different states, and virtually every city was autonomous in some shape or form, with states like the Qandahar and Herat becoming independent. Ranjit Singh sent his generals Hari Singh Nalwa and Mahan Singh Hazarawala (as deputy commander of Nalwa) to annex Peshawar. After a brief fighting, Hari Singh Nalwa captured the city. The news of the conquest of Peshawar quickly reached Kabul where Dost Mohammad Khan learnt of his deposed brothers' defeat. Hari Singh Nalwa was appointed as the governor of the city by maharaja Ranjit Singh.
