= Raizada =

Raizada or Raijada is an Indian surname and a courtesy title used by the Mohyal Brahmin caste of the Punjabi Hindu community, some Chudasama Rajputs of Gujarat, and the Kayastha community.

== Notable people ==
- Prem Behari Narain Raizada, calligrapher of the Constitution of India
- Niharica Raizada (born 1990), Luxembourgish actress and former Miss India UK
- Shilpa Raizada, Indian actress
- Satpal Raizada, Indian politician and member of the Himachal Pradesh Legislative Assembly
