= Maharaja Ranjit Singh's throne =

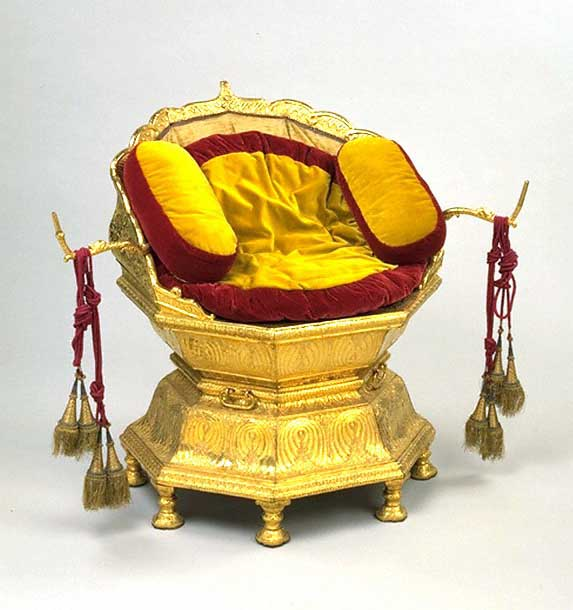
Maharaja Ranjit Singh's throne

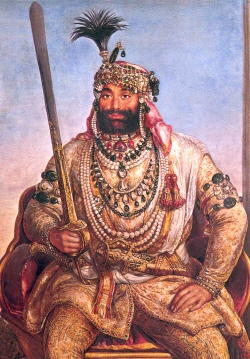
Maharaja Sher Singh seated on the golden throne of Maharaja Ranjit Singh (ca. 1840s)

Maharaja Ranjit Singh's throne was made by the goldsmith Hafez Muhammad Multani about 1820 to 1830, for the eponymous ruler of the Sikh empire. It is made of a wood and resin core, covered with sheets of repoussé, chased and engraved gold.

== Overview ==
It shows the splendour of Ranjit Singh's court and is decorated with richly worked sheets of gold. The distinctive cusped base of this throne is composed of two tiers of lotus petals. The lotus is a symbol of purity and creation and a Lotus throne has traditionally been used as a seat or throne for Hindu gods. It is thought that as the Maharaja was renowned for the simplicity of his appearance and dislike of ceremony he rarely sat on this throne, preferring to sit cross-legged on carpets.

The throne was part of the State Property taken by the East India Company in 1849 after their annexation of the Punjab in the Second Anglo-Sikh War. It was taken to London from Lahore and displayed with other treasures of the British Empire at the Great Exhibition in 1851. It then went on display in the India Museum, also in London. Indian student Rakhal das Haldar visited it there and recorded that "it was painful to see the state chair of gold of the late Lion of Punjab Ranjit Singh with a mere picture upon it".

The throne later passed to the Victoria & Albert Museum, where it is currently housed under inventory number 2518(IS). During the late twentieth century it was the subject of a repatriation claim by a Sikh regional organisation supported by the Indian government. The claim was rejected by the museum.

== Bibliography ==
- Jackson, Anna, ed. (2001). V&A: A Hundred Highlights. V&A Publications.
