= Datt =

Mohyal Brahmin clan from Punjab

Datt/Dutt is a Mohyal Brahmin clan from Punjab.

A faction of this community, called Hussaini Brahmin, has a legend claiming that their ancestors fought for Imam Hussain in the Battle of Karbala.

== See also ==
- Chitpavan
- Tyagi
- Bhumihar Brahmins
