= Mohan (clan) =

Mohan is a Mohyal Brahmin clan found primarily in the Punjab region of India.
