= Bhimwal =

Bhimwal is a Mohyal Brahmin clan found primarily in the Punjab region.
