= Mohyal Brahmin =

Sub-caste of Saraswat Brahmins from Punjab

Mohyal Brahmins are a sub-caste of Saraswat Brahmins from the Punjab region. A sub-group of the Punjabi Hindu community, Mohyal caste comprises seven clans, namely Bali, Bhimwal, Chhibber, Datt, Lau, Mohan and Vaid.

Several Mohyal families might also opt to use surnames like Bakhshi, Bhai, Chaudhri, Dewan, Malik, Mehta, and Raizada, as a hereditary courtesy title bestowed upon their families for their bravery and service.

According to an oral tradition, some Mohyal Brahmins helped Imam Hussain in the Battle of Karbala; these Mohyal Brahmins are called Hussaini Brahmins. Prior to the partition of India, Mohyal Brahmins lived primarily in the western Punjab, including present-day Hazara Division and the Pir Panjal regions of Khyber Pakhtunkhwa and Jammu and Kashmir respectively.

After the partition, most migrated to, and settled in the new created Republic of India. As per data by the Government of Punjab, the priestly practice of Mohyal Brahmins has slowly reduced after the partition. Mohyals do not perform priestly duties.

== Contributions to Sikhism ==
The majority of Mohyal Brahmins identify as Hindu, with some also identifying as Sikh. Guru Nanak, continuing in the tradition of Bhakti saints, revitalised Sanatan ('Hindu') wisdom in order to make to accessible for the common people of late Medieval India. As a part of this transformation, many Punjabi Hindus, including the Mohyals, revered and followed Guru Nanak. This devotion towards Nanak's mat (teachings/wisdom) led them to follow Nanak's successors and then assist in the creation of the Sikh ethos. Moreover, as the latter Gurus became martial, this community was a natural home for the warrior-class of the Punjabi Hindus.

Some notable Mohyals include the brothers Bhai Mati Das and Bhai Sati Das, both died alongside the ninth Guru, Guru Tegh Bahadur, for protecting Hinduism from Aurangeb's extremist policy.

== See also ==
- Khatri
- Arora
