= Sikh Empire =

Empire on the Indian subcontinent, 1799–1849

- 1799–1849
- Flag Motif
- Motto: ਅਕਾਲ ਸਹਾਇ; Akāl Sahāi "With God's Grace"
- Anthem: ਦੇਗ ਤੇਗ ਫ਼ਤਿਹ; Dēg Tēg Fateh "Victory to Charity and Arms"
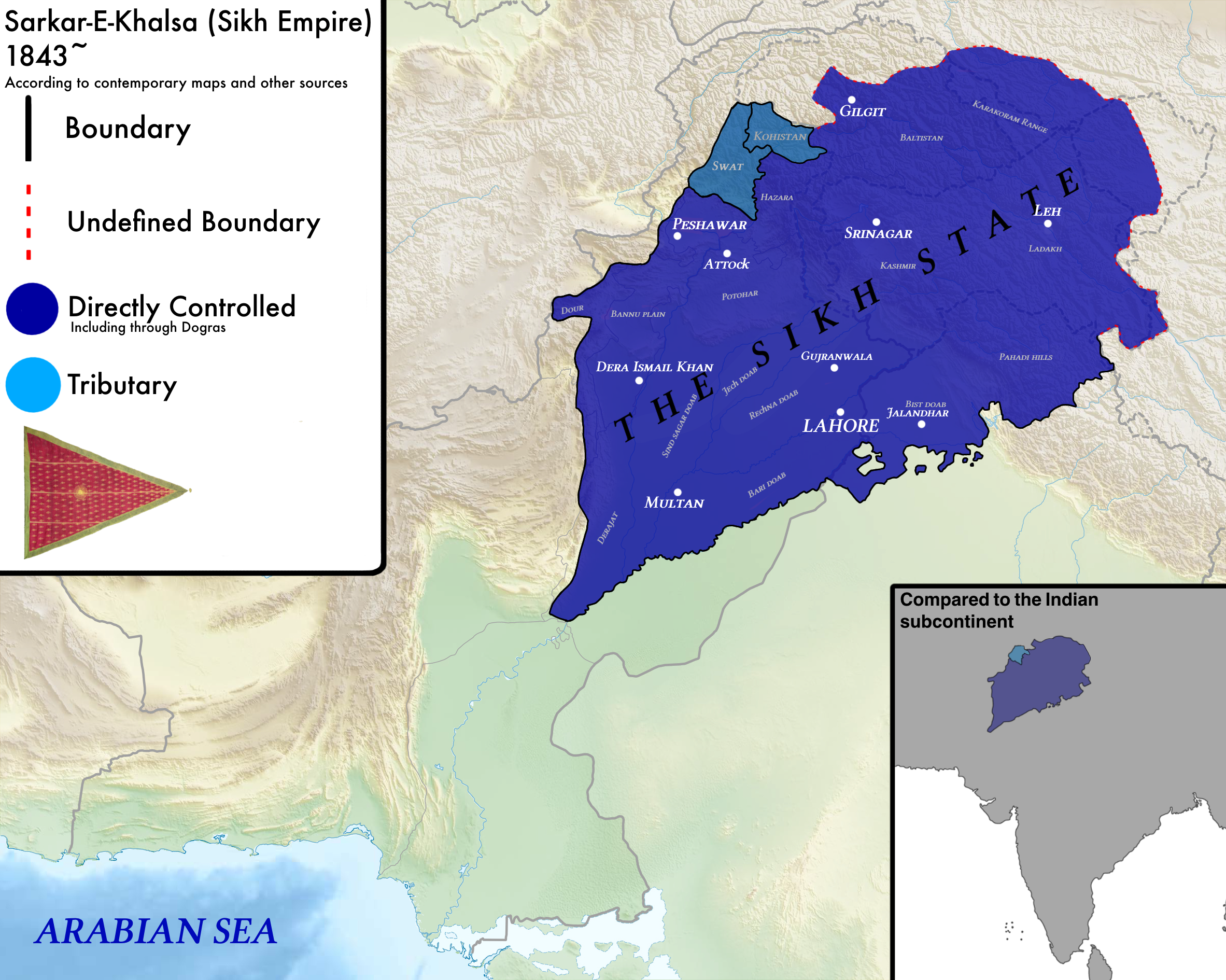
- The Sikh Empire c. 1843 at its greatest territorial extent.
- Status: Empire
- Capital: Gujranwala (1799–1802); Lahore (1802–1849)
- Official languages: Persian (court, administration)
- Common languages: Punjabi (language of the nobility): Lahnda; Kangri; Dogri; Pashto; Kashmiri; Hindustani
- Religion: 9–10% Sikhism (official); 80% Islam; 10% Hinduism; 1% Buddhism, Christianity, Judaism, others (Note: Buddhism was mostly confined to Ladakh. Christianity and Judaism includes firangi soldiers and officials.)
- Government: Federal monarchy
- Maharaja
  - 1801–1839: Ranjit Singh (first)
  - 1843–1849: Duleep Singh (last)
- Regent
  - 1840–1841: Chand Kaur
  - 1843–1846: Jind Kaur
- Vizier
  - 1799–1818: Khushal Singh (first)
  - 1846: Gulab Singh (last)
- Historical era: Early modern period
  - Capture of Lahore by Ranjit Singh: 7 July 1799
  - End of Second Anglo-Sikh War: 29 March 1849

Area
- 1839: 520,000 km^{2} (200,000 sq mi)

Population
  - 1800s: 12,000,000
- Currency: Nanakshahi Sikke
Preceded by
Sikh Confederacy
Durrani Empire
Kangra State
Jaswan State
Guler State
Nurpur kingdom
Datarpur State
Sial dynasty
Maqpon dynasty
Namgyal dynasty
Jammu State
Succeeded by
Punjab Province (British India)
Jammu and Kashmir (princely state)
- Today part of: India; Pakistan; China

The Sikh Empire was a regional power based in the Punjab region of South Asia. It existed from 1799, when Maharaja Ranjit Singh captured Lahore, to 1849, when it was defeated and annexed by the British East India Company following the Second Anglo-Sikh War. At its peak in the mid-19th century, the empire extended from Gilgit and Tibet in the north to the deserts of Sindh in the south and from the Khyber Pass in the west to the Sutlej in the east, and was divided into 8 provinces. (Note: The 8 provinces were Lahore, Jalandhar, Kangra, Jammu, Kashmir, Peshawar, Multan and Gujrat or Wazirabad.) Religiously diverse, with an estimated population of 12 million in 1800 (making it the 12th most populous state at the time), it was the last major region of the Indian subcontinent to be conquered by the British Empire.

In 1799, Ranjit Singh of the Sukerchakia Misl captured Lahore from the Sikh triumvirate which had been ruling it since 1765, and was confirmed on the possession of Lahore by the Durrani ruler, Zaman Shah. He was formally crowned on 12 April 1801 by Sahib Singh Bedi, a descendant of Guru Nanak. Ranjit Singh rose to power in a very short period, from a leader of a single misl to finally becoming the Maharaja of Punjab. By 1813 all the remaining Sikh misls had been annexed by Ranjit Singh, and the following years saw progressive expulsion of the Afghans from Punjab; the Afghan influence east of Indus ended after the fall of Multan in 1818. In the subsequent decades Durrani Afghans lost Kashmir and Peshawar to the Sikhs as well. By 1840 Ladakh and Baltistan had been brought under Sikh suzerainty by Gulab Singh. Ranjit Singh modernised his army using the latest training as well as weapons and artillery.

After the death of Maharaja Ranjit Singh in 1839, the empire was weakened by the British East India Company stoking internal divisions and political mismanagement. Finally, in 1849, the state was dissolved after its defeat in the Second Anglo-Sikh War.

== Terminology ==
The empire is also referred to as the Lahore State, such as in contemporary British maps. The term Lahore Darbar refers to the Sikh court at Lahore of the empire's ruling government. (Note: Alternatively spelt as 'Lahore Durbar'.) However, the term "Lahore Darbar" gained currency only around the time of Ranjit Singh's death, and was not found in British sources until then. The empire's own Persian chronicles refers to its ruling government as the Sarkar Khalsaji. According to Priya Atwal, the polity was known in Punjabi as Sarkar-i-Khalsa. The contemporary British and other Europeans referred to the state as the Kingdom of Lahore and its ruling family as the Lahore royal family. The term Sikh Empire came into popular usage in the 20th century, perhaps as an English-language equivalent to the "Sarkar-i-Khalsa" term. The period of Sikh rule was also referred to as Sikha shahi, a term that has survived to the present age with various meanings.

== History ==
=== Background ===
Sikhism originated in the 16th-century Punjab with the teachings of Guru Nanak. Initially a pacifist faith, the followers of Sikhism (known as Sikhs) became increasingly militarised owing to their conflicts with the Mughal Empire and the killing of their gurus, Guru Arjan and Guru Tegh Bahadur, on the orders of Mughal emperors. With the decline of Mughal power after the death of Aurangzeb in 1707, the tenth and last Sikh guru Gobind Singh established a militia known as Khalsa Fauj. The first Sikh state led by Banda Singh Bahadur was short-lived, but by the mid-18th century a confederation of twelve Sikh states, known as misls, was firmly established in central and eastern Punjab. The Dal Khalsa armies of the twelve misls engaged in numerous conflicts with the Mughals as well as the invading Afghan armies, especially those led by Ahmad Shah Abdali. They also fought with the neighbouring hill rajas and among each other.

Ranjit Singh, the founder of Sikh Empire, was born in the ruling family of Sukerchakia Misl in 1780.

=== Empire ===
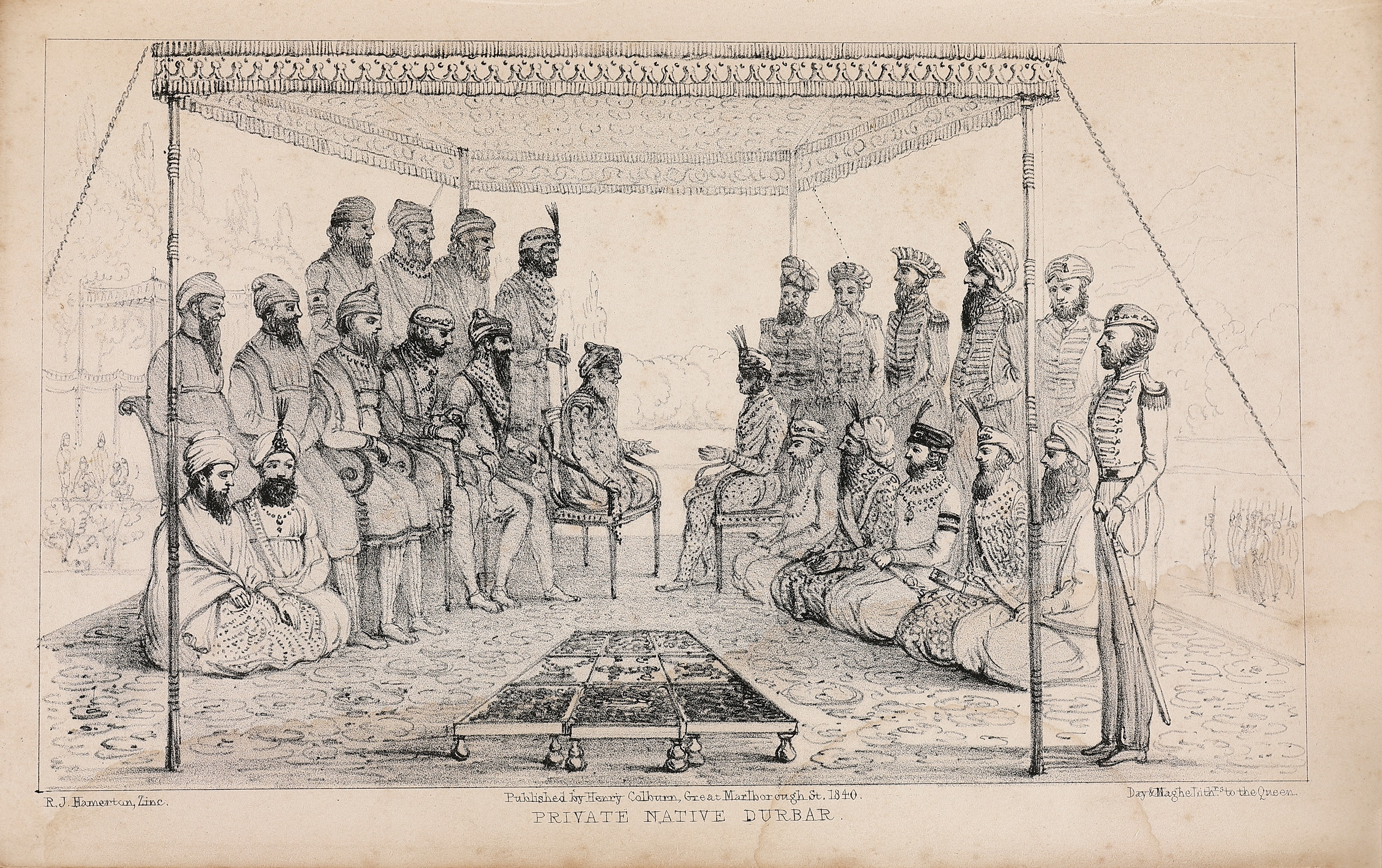
Ranjit Singh holding court in 1838

Ranjit Singh succeeded his father Maha Singh at the age of thirteen in 1792. In 1797, Ranjit Singh besieged Rasulnagar, the capital of the Chattha Jats, with whom Sukerchakias had a bitter rivalry. The Chattha chief Jan Muhammad was killed in the siege and Rasulnagar, now renamed Ramnagar, was annexed.

In 1797–98, Zaman Shah Durrani invaded Punjab, but was forced to retreat, following which Ranjit Singh captured Lahore. The local dignitaries and people welcomed him in the city. Ranjit Singh formally moved the capital from Gujranwala, where it had been established in 1763 by his grandfather Charat Singh, to Lahore in 1799. In 1800, the Jammu region was annexed by Ranjit Singh.

The coronation of Ranjit Singh happened at Lahore in 1801, marking the formal beginning of the Sikh Empire. It was followed by a decade-long process of conquest of remaining Sikh misls, starting with Amritsar in 1802, which was largely complete by 1812. All the misl leaders, who were affiliated with the army, were the nobility with usually long and prestigious family backgrounds in Sikh history.

In 1807, forces of Ranjit Singh attacked Kasur and, after a month of fierce fighting, captured it. In the same year he also annexed the Sial-ruled Jhang. In 1813, his general Mohkam Chand fought against the Afghan forces of Shah Mahmud led by Fateh Khan Barakzai, and Attock Fort was captured by Ranjit Singh in that battle.

The expanding Sikh Empire in 1809. The Cis-Sutlej states are visible south of the Sutlej River

The Cis-Sutlej states were a group of Sikh states lying between the Sutlej River and the Yamuna River. They had been under the suzerainty of the British East India Company since the second Anglo-Maratha War of 1803–1805. Ranjit Singh occupied one of the states, Faridkot, in 1807. However, the control was restored to Gulab Singh of Faridkot in 1809 after the signing of Amritsar treaty between the Lahore Darbar and the British East India Company, which demarcated eastern borders of Sikh Empire at Sutlej. Friendly relations were established with the British following the signing of the treaty.

Multan was conquered in 1818, which ended Afghan influence in Punjab. In 1819, after the battle of Shopian, Ranjit Singh successfully defeated the Afghans and annexed the Kashmir Valley, expanding his rule towards the north and the Jhelum Valley, beyond the foothills of the Himalayas. The Namgyal dynasty of Ladakh paid regular annual tribute to the Sikh Empire, starting from 1819. The tribute was paid through the local Sikh governors of Kashmir.

His general Hari Singh Nalwa also achieved important victories in Hazara and Peshawar. Peshawar became tributary in 1823. Syed Ahmad Barelvi led his movement against the Sikh Empire from 1826 until his death in the battle of Balakot in 1831. Peshawar was formally annexed in 1834 by the Sikh Empire. In 1835, the Afghans and the Sikhs met again at the Khyber Pass; however, the standoff ended without a battle. In 1837, the Battle of Jamrud became the last confrontation with the Afghans at the western boundaries of the Sikh Empire.

Ranjit Singh had restored Gulab Singh Dogra the estates of his father at Jammu in 1820 as jagir. Gulab Singh, now a tributary noble of Sikh Empire, embarked on an ambitious plan to expand his domains. After occupying neighbouring Muslim principalities of Kishtwar, Poonch and Rajouri, he sent his general Zorawar Singh to conquer the Namgyal kingdom in 1834.

In 1838, Ranjit Singh sent his troops to march into Kabul to take part in the victory parade along with the British after restoring Shah Shoja to the Afghan throne at Kabul. Ranjit Singh died in 1839.

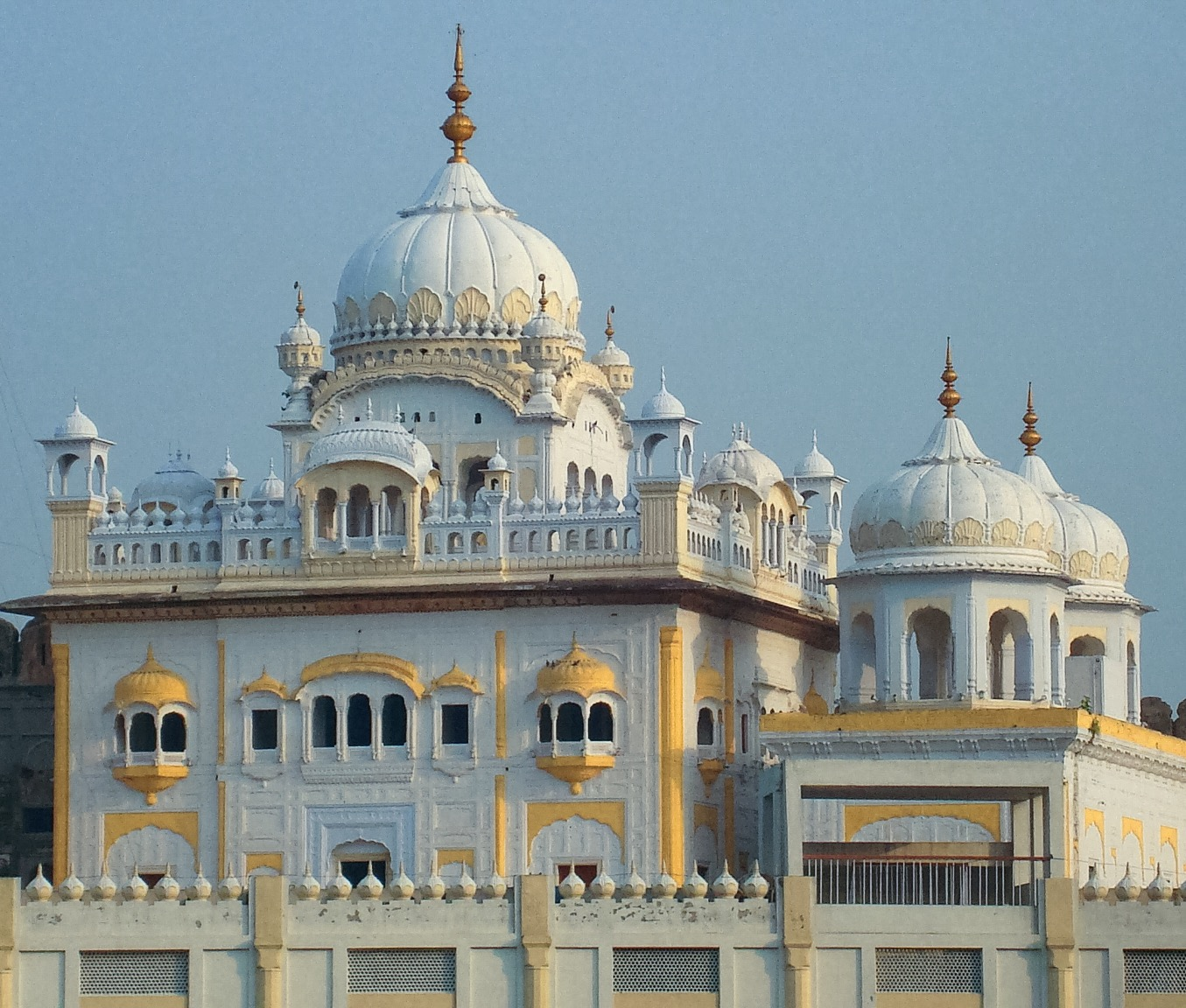
The Samadhi of Ranjit Singh is located in Lahore, Pakistan, adjacent to the Badshahi Mosque

Baltistan, under the rule of Ahmad Shah Maqpon of Skardu, was conquered in 1839–40 by Zorawar Singh, bringing it under suzerainty of the Sikh Empire. During the Sino-Sikh war of 1841, the forces of the empire invaded Tibet, which was then under the control of the Qing dynasty. However, the invasion was short-lived as Zorawar Singh was killed.

The main geographical footprint of the empire was from the Punjab region to Khyber Pass in the west, to Kashmir in the north, Sindh in the south, and Tibet in the east. The frontier policy of Ranjit Singh of holding the Khyber Pass was later used by the British Raj.

==== Decline ====
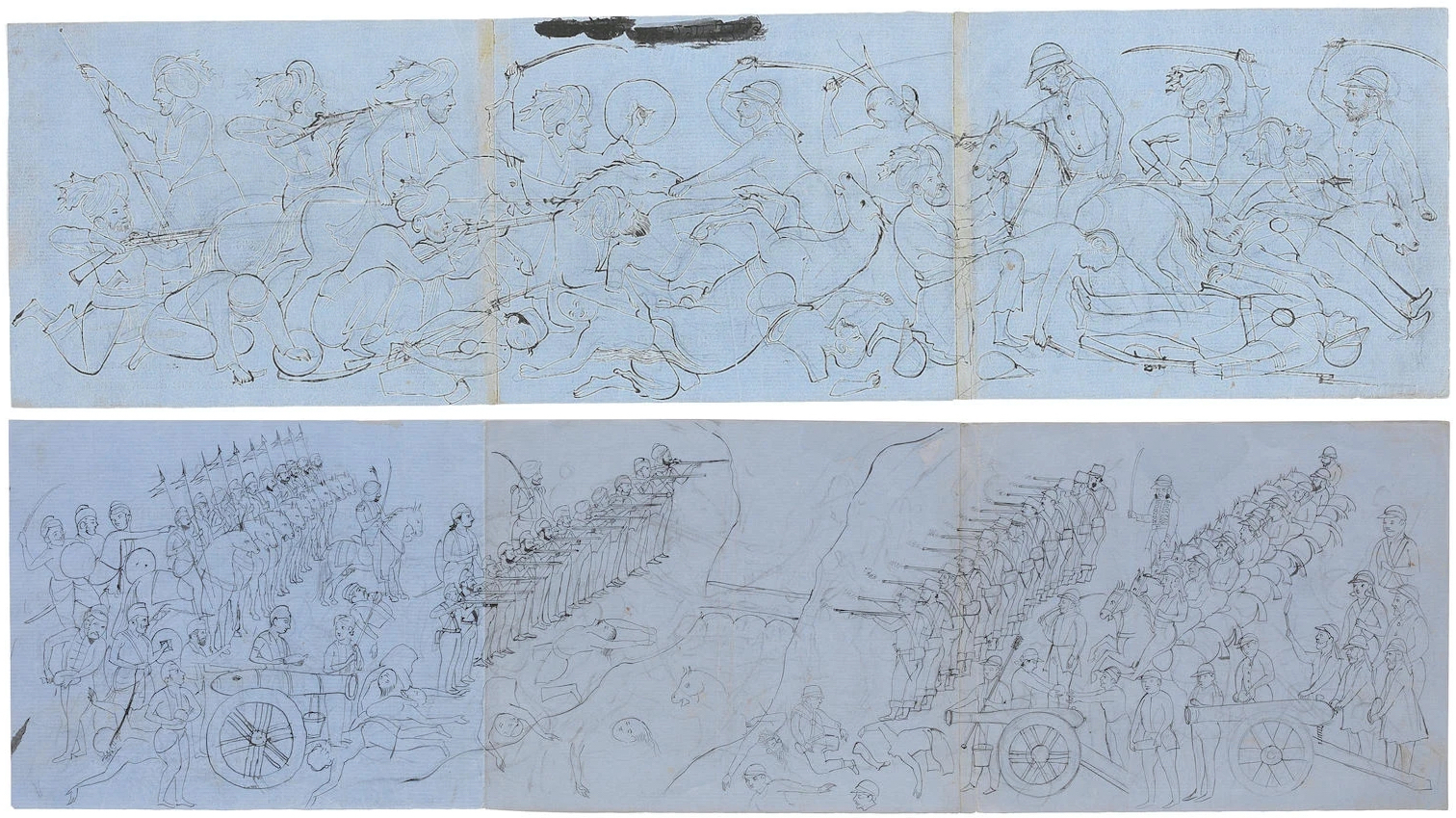
Two late 19th century drawings of Sikh troops in action against British forces during the Anglo-Sikh Wars

After the death of Ranjit Singh in 1839, the empire was severely weakened by internal divisions and political mismanagement. The leadership of the empire passed through a quick succession of rulers, namely Kharak Singh, Nau Nihal Singh, Chand Kaur, and Sher Singh, who kept being assassinated, with no ruler being able to rule for a sustained period of time, leading to instability. After the murder of Sher Singh, Duleep Singh was appointed as the new ruler by the Panch (Military Council) with Jind Kaur as regnant since Duleep was a child. Due to internal divisions and factionalism (include the British colluding with internal fifth-columnists), Jind Kaur was advised to go to war against the East India Company to distract the Sikh Army and decrease their power and influence in the affairs of the state, leading to the First Anglo-Sikh War. The Sikh army crossed the Sutlej river, violating the terms of an earlier 1809 treaty, starting the war.

The Sikh crossing of the Sutlej, following British militarisation of the border with Punjab (from 2,500 men and six guns in 1838 to 17,612 men and 66 guns in 1844, and 40,523 men and 94 guns in 1845), and plans on using the newly conquered territory of Sindh as a springboard to advance on the Sikh-held region of Multan, eventually resulted in the First Anglo-Sikh War.

In the Battle of Ferozeshah in 1845, the British encountered the Khalsa Army, opening with a gun-duel in which the Sikhs "had the better of the British artillery". As the British made advances, Europeans in their army were specially targeted, as the Sikhs believed if the army "became demoralized, the backbone of the enemy's position would be broken". The fighting continued throughout the night. Nevertheless, the British army emerged victorious. In the following treaty of Lahore which ended hostilities, a huge indemnity of two crore rupees was imposed on the Lahore Darbar. As it could not pay the fine, Lahore Darbar was forced to concede Hazara and Kashmir to the British for the payment of one crore, which were subsequently sold by British to Gulab Singh Dogra in the 1846 treaty of Amritsar. British also recognised his prior conquests in Ladakh and Baltistan, laying foundation of the princely state of Jammu and Kashmir.

Following the defeat of the Sikhs in the First Anglo-Sikh War, Lord Dalhousie orchestrated the Sikhs to rebel, with him blaming the court of Lahore and the Maharaja for the rebellion in an effort to legitimize the annexation of the Sikh kingdom, declaring a war on behalf of the British on the Sikh kingdom, starting the second war. Diwan Mulraj, a timid man, found himself being placed as the leader of a rebellion brewing in Multan without much agency of his own after the murders of the British officials Vans Agnew and Lt. Anderson. Rather than immediately quashing the Multani rebellion, Currie, the British Resident in Lahore, decided to let it fester and spread so he could implicate the Sikh Maharaja, the Council of Regency, and the Khalsa army in the turmoil and therefore have cause to get rid of them afterwards. The Attariwalas, namely Chattar Singh and his son Sher Singh, were initially on the British side (as were most of the Sikh leaders initially being loyal to the British Resident), however increasing aggression from the British and betrayals led them to eventually joining the cause of the rebels. Duleep Singh was too young to decide on matters and his mother Jind Kaur who had acted on his behalf had been exiled from the Punjab by this point. Maharaj Singh, a Sikh religious figure, urged the local population of the land and the Sikh Army to side with the Multani rebels and push the British out of the Punjab. Chattar Singh Attariwala promised the Afghan emir the return of Peshawar if they assisted the Sikh cause on expelling the British from the Punjab. Despite the Sikhs surprising the British at the battles of Ram Nagar and Chillianwala, they were decisively defeated in the final engagement at Gujrat. The retreating Sikhs were surrounded on all sides, cut off from any attempt to join forces with their Afghan ally, and Chattar Singh Attariwala and his son Sher Singh Attariwala unconditionally surrendered to the British at their camp near Rawalpindi on 14 March 1849.

After the second war, the British extracted heavy war duties from the Lahore Darbar. On 29 March 1849, a durbar was convened at a fort where Eliot read a proclamation on the ending of the Sikh kingdom, with the proclamation stating: "All the property of the State of whatever description and wheresoever found shall be confiscated to the Honourable East India Company". With this proclamation, Maharaja Duleep Singh forfeited the Koh-i-Noor diamond to the British and stepped-down from his father's throne. The Sikh Empire was formally dissolved at the end of the Second Anglo-Sikh War via a proclamation on 30 March 1849. Formal annexation occurred on 2 April 1849, with a three-man administrative board being established. However, the annexation was conducted by Dalhousie without the home government's authority and against opposition by Henry Lawrence. The last ruler, Duleep Singh, was expelled from the Punjab with a pension of 120,000 rupees annually (£50,000) and his property worth 15 million rupees was confiscated by the British, including the Koh-i-Noor diamond. Duleep eventually settled in Britain. The province of Punjab was formed. Punjab became a Chief Commissionership in 1853. During Henry Lawrence period, Punjab did not experience much rebellion during the 1857 insurrection. A Lieutenant Governorship in Punjab was established in 1858.

The collapse of the Sikh Empire is attributed to its loss in both of its wars against the East India Company. Much of its military defeats is attributed to two figures, Lal Singh and Tej Singh, who are seen as betraying the Sikhs from within and supporting the British secretly. Lepel Griffin stated the following about Ranjit Singh's empire:

Napoleonic in the suddenness of its rise, the brilliancy of its success, and the completeness of its overthrow.

— Lepel H. Griffin

Patwant Singh rather than blaming the decline of the empire on the British, Dogras, and Brahmins (the latter two who subverted the empire internally) instead blamed the decline of the empire on the Sikhs and specifically, Ranjit Singh by "ignoring the republican temper of the Khalsa and leaving its fate to monarchial whims". Ranjit Singh lacked foresight and failed to ensure that the tenets and traditions of the Sikh faith which held the empire together while he was alive would be continued after his death, with it falling apart under his successors. Patwant Singh concludes:

Lacking his powerful personality and charisma, incapable of providing inspiring leadership, blind to the betrayals around them, and unable to understand the dynamics of the Khalsa, Ranjit Singh’s successors mindlessly destroyed a distinctive moment in Sikh history.

— Patwant Singh, The Sikhs (2000), page 174

== Administration and state ==
=== Government ===
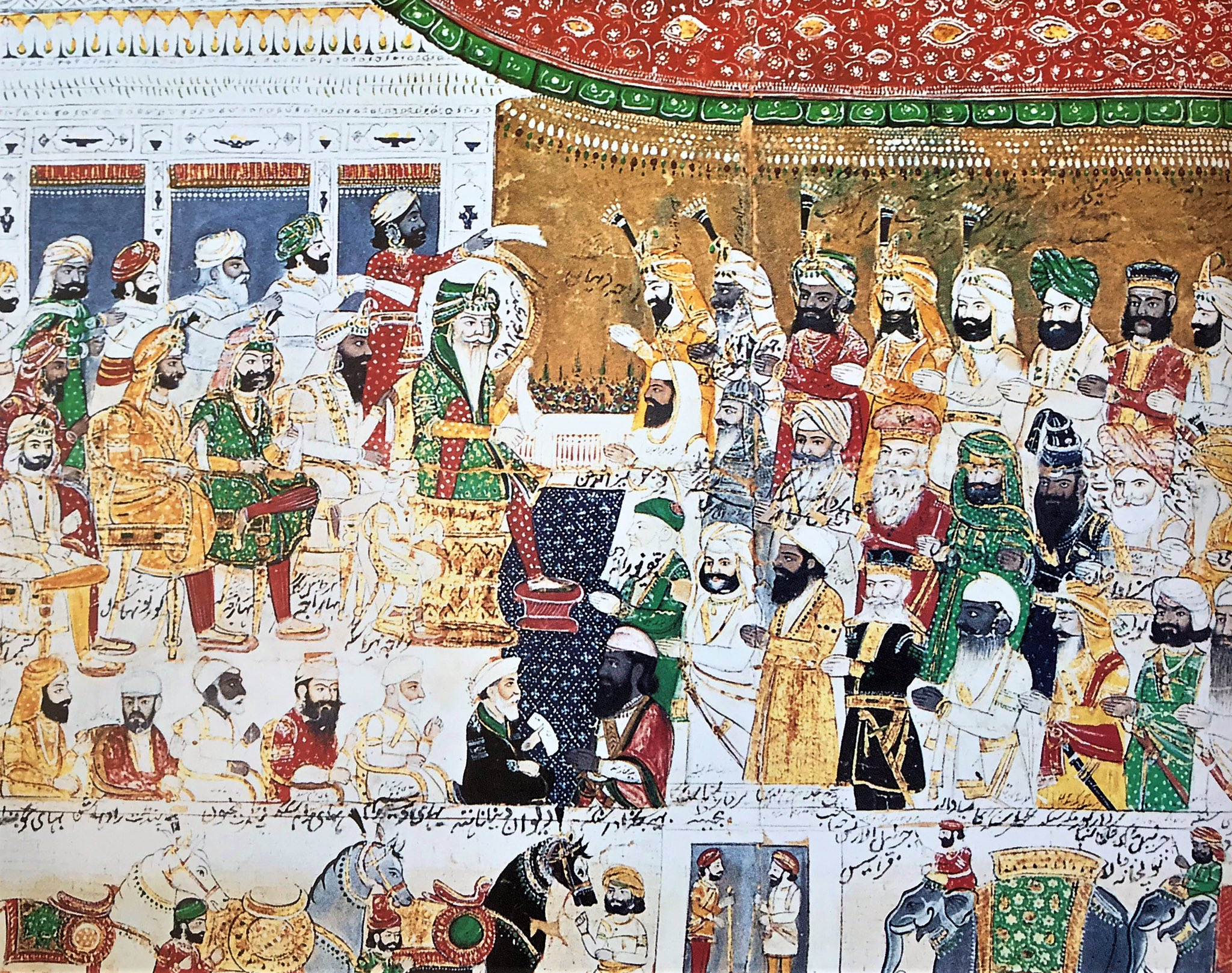
Detail from ‘Darbar (royal court) of Maharaja Ranjit Singh’, gouache, ca.1850

The empire's ruling court based out of Lahore is termed the Lahore Darbar or Khalsa Darbar. Faqir Saifuddin of the Fakir Khana Museum prefers to use the term Punjab Darbar rather than "Khalsa Darbar", owing to the large role Muslims played in Ranjit Singh's court. The ruling court was diverse and under the ultimate command of the ruling maharaja, who was the "drum of the Khalsa". In-theory, the Sikh court was based on the Khalsa ideals propounded by Guru Gobind Singh yet the court was secular in-practice. As an example of this secularism, members of the court came from various religious background, including Sikhs, Hindus, Muslims, and Christians. Furthermore, the members also came from various ethnic, regional, and caste backgrounds, such as Dogras, Rajputs, Brahmins, Jats, and Europeans. Whilst Ranjit Singh himself preferred to dress modestly, the Sikh court was filled with elaborately garbed and decorated members. Only three individuals were permitted to be seated on chairs within the durbar, them namely being heir-apparent Kharak Singh, Kanwar Sher Singh, and Raja Hira Singh. Three sides of the hall of the durbar were covered with golden-pillars, with shawl carpets that were embroidered with gold and silver, and inset with precious stones, decorating the floor. The maharaja was seated on a golden throne, with Ranjit Singh preferring to sit cross-legged on it. The member of the court allowed to be seated behind the maharaja was Raja Dhian Singh. The rest of the members of the court were seated as per their rank and status. The colours of the Sikh court were yellow and green. Thus, most of its members donned yellow-coloured dressings made from Kashmiri silk or woolens. However, there existed no strict categorisation scheme of the rankings of the constituent members of the Lahore Darbar, thus the rankings of its members was determined by the level of trust the maharaja held in them. The court also granted awards upon its members, with most of these essentially being bestowed titles in the form of honorifics, however some members were granted jagirs (estate grant). Laziness was heavily looked-down upon with the court, with the ruling maharaja often sending out the court's members on military or diplomatic missions.

The business of the ruling government was carried out in Lahore, specifically the Musamman Burj located within the Lahore Fort. A public court was held from morning until noon in the Diwan-i-Aam ("hall of audience"), with the court being attended by important members of the court, including princes, ministers, nobles, and civil and military officers. Some matters discussed in the court include high-level civil and military appointments, reports from the provincial governors (provincial satraps) and kardars (tax collectors). When matters of the court were read-out, royal decrees made orally were transferred into writing for final approval. Tributes and nazaranas were also exchanged or bestowed within the court. Supplicants to the court were dismissed with khill'ats (robes) or monetary gifts. When the maharaja was travelling, the court ceased to be static and was held at whatever location the maharaja's retinue decided to hold-up at, often under a tree or whilst moving on horseback. The maharaja would dictate orders to provincial governors whilst inspecting their troops or even in the midst of battle.

Noble members of the court, including relatives of the royal family, resided in palatial haveli structures and donned expensive clothing and accessories (such as jewellery). The Sikh princes, and also Raja Dhian Singh, were permitted to hold their own miniature durbars (courts).

=== Foreign affairs ===
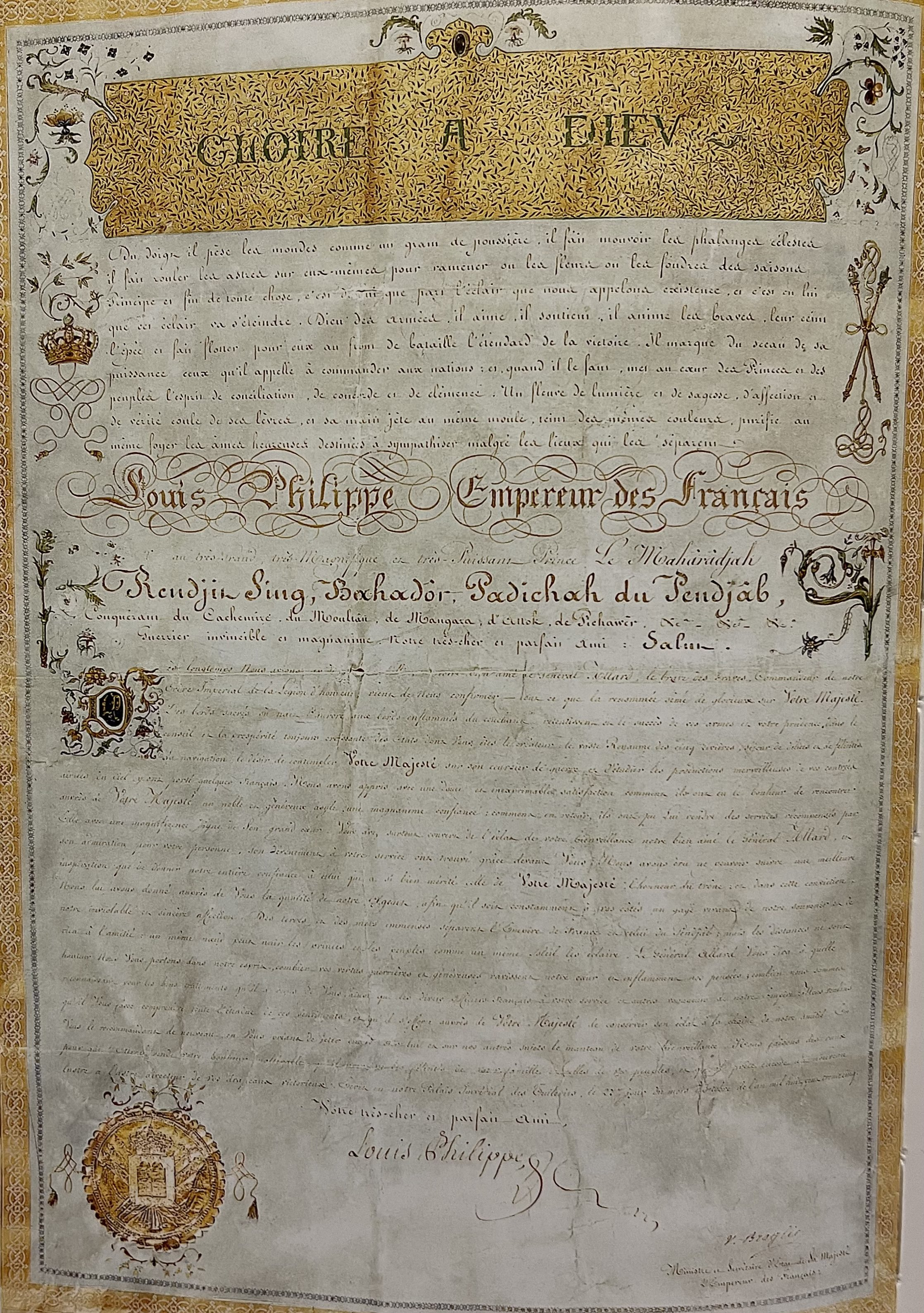
A letter sent from the King of France, Louis-Philippe to Maharaja Ranjit Singh. Ranjit Singh is addressed as "Rendjit Sing Bahador – Padichah du Pendjab". 27 October 1835

Foreign visitors to the Sikh court were treated with respect and hospitality, with many contemporary accounts of foreign visitors to the court noting the good-treatment afforded to them by the state. When a foreign visitor arrived, they would be greeted by a protocol officer, who would arrange for their temporary residence, which was based upon the status of the visitor. The state government paid for the expenses regarding the visitor's entertainment. There exists accounts of visitors being gifted by the state, with presents such as fruits, sweets, wines, and also money. Full displays of the empire's regalia and military forces were displayed during important ceremonial functions, such as the marriages of important nobles or when receiving high-level foreign diplomatic dignitaries.

In order to keep tabs and updated on the happenings of surrounding regions, including remote parts of its territory and foreign countries, the Sikh court received reports from the waqa'nawis (news-writers) located in the empire's provinces (subas). The reports were dispatched to the Lahore Darbar at regular intervals. Furthermore, the vakils (agents) of foreign countries were associated with the Sikh court on a reciprocal basis. The Sikh court had news-writers located in Afghanistan and also had its own vakil emissaries in the Cis-Sutlej States and also in territory under the British East India Company's rule. Other vakil emissaries of the Sikh court were sent to Rajputana, the Marathas, and Nepal on complimentary missions.

Western/European officers from various backgrounds, including Britishers, Frenchmen, Germans, Italians, Spaniards, Americans, and Russians, also rose to high levels within the Sikh court in many instances. However, the Sikh court was wary of the Westerners within the court, and therefore kept them under strict regulation. These foreign Western members of the court were persuaded by the state to integrate themselves by marrying a local woman, settling down within the empire, and adopt the cultural customs of the locals, such as growing out a beard or wearing a turban. The Western members of the court were also banned from publicly consuming beef or smoking.

The Sikh Empire did enact a simple border policy where it did not allow uninvited foreigners into the state. The purpose of this border policy was to dissuade potential foreign spies from entering the country. An example of the policy in-action is the case of Captain Arnold Mathews, who snuck into the Sikh Empire in circa 1808 to spy under the guise of being a tourist headed towards Kashmir but was intercepted and brought to Lahore.

=== Holidays ===
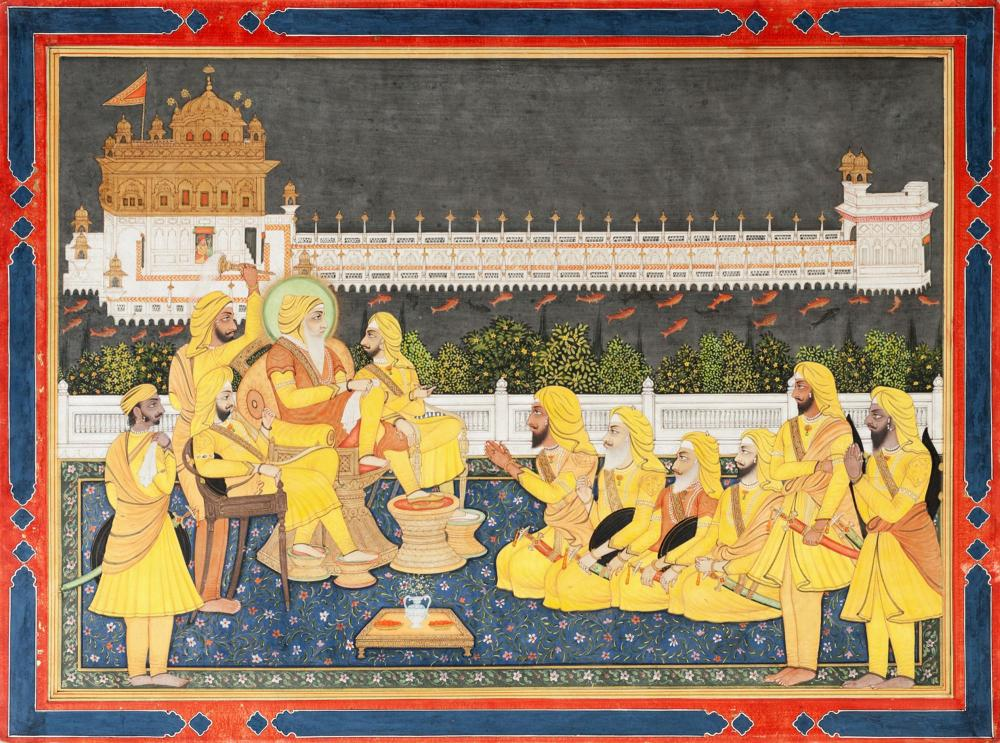
Maharaja Ranjit Singh holding court outside near the Golden Temple in Amritsar with everyone dressed in Basant (yellow)

The Sikh court observed the festivals of Vaisakhi, Dussehra, Basant, Holi, and Diwali. Vaisakhi was considered an especially auspicious celebration within the Sikh court, with it giving and distributing gifts of money, gold, silver, cows, horses, elephants, gold-bangles, and food to Brahmins and the poor. During Basant celebrations, the military troops of the empire were paraded donning yellow uniforms, with members of the Sikh court and nobles also wearing yellow clothing on the day. During Basant, the officials bore gifts for the sovereign ruler, with the ruler in-turn bestowing robe-of-honours to the officials based on their rank and status. During celebrations of Dussehra, the Sikh court assembled itself at Amritsar and the jagirdari troops of the empire's military were paraded and inspected by the maharaja.

=== Geography ===
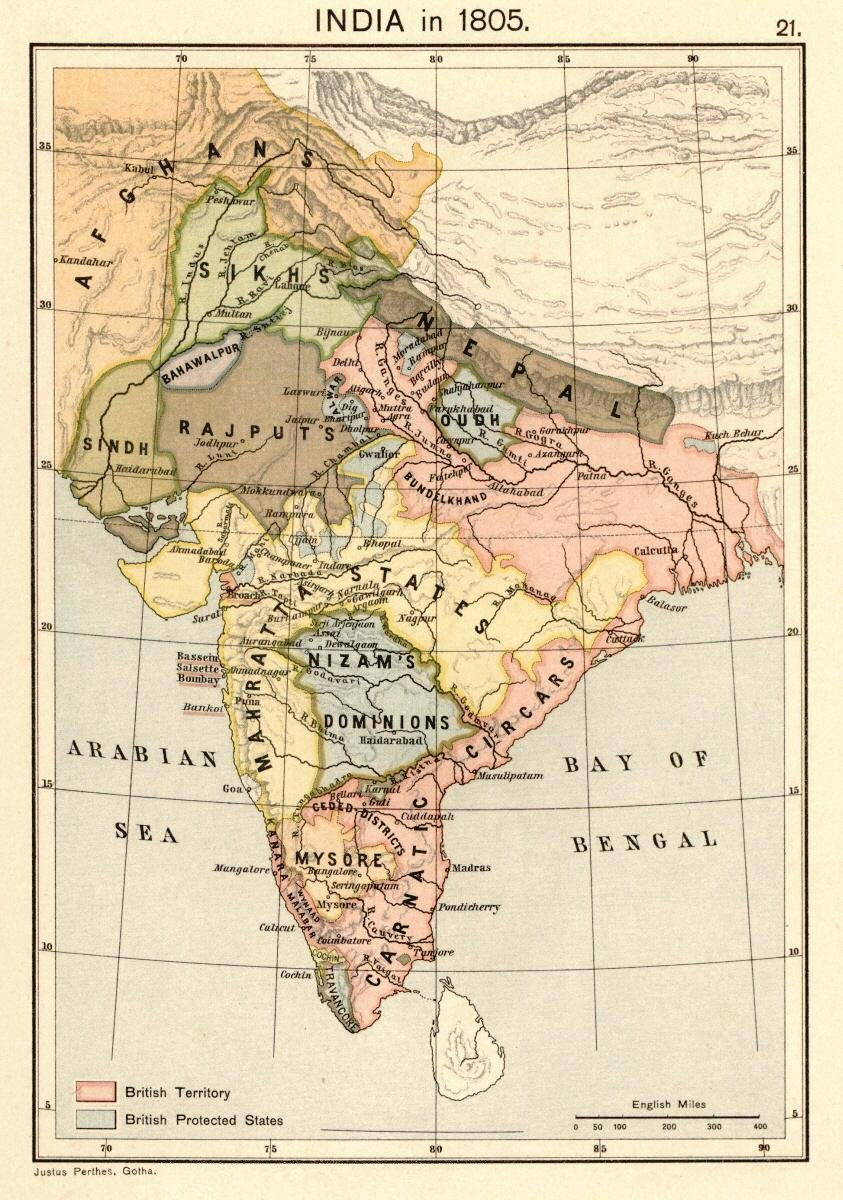
The Indian subcontinent in 1805.

The Sikh Empire spanned a total of over 200,000 sq mi (520,000 km^{2}) at its zenith. Another more conservative estimate puts its total surface area during its zenith at 100,436 sq mi (260,124 km sq). Jean-Marie Lafont states that the empire comprised a territory of 390,000 square kilometres. It comprised much of Punjab, Pakistan until Mithankot in the south and excluding Bahawalpur State, Kashmir Valley, Baltistan, Gilgit, Ladakh, Punjab, India excluding most of the territory south of Sutlej, the territories northwest of Sutlej in Himachal Pradesh, India, Jammu Division, and Peshawar in Khyber Pakhtunkhwa, Pakistan. Jamrud formed the westernmost limit of the Sikh Empire.

==== Administrative divisions ====
The empire was divided into various provinces (known as Subas), with them namely being as follows as per Hari Ram Gupta:

Provinces of the Sikh Empire
No.	Name	Map	Estimated population (1838)	Major population centres
1.	Lahore		1,900,000	Lahore, Amritsar and Gujranwala
2.	Multan		750,000	Multan, Laiah and Dera Ghazi Khan
3.	Peshawar		550,000	Peshawar, Kohat, Hazara, Dera Ismail Khan and Bannu
4.	Kashmir			Srinagar
5.	Jammu		1,100,000	Jammu
6.	Gujrat/Wazirabad			Gujrat, Attock, Rawalpindi and Mianwali
7.	Jalandhar			Jalandhar
8.	Kangra			Kangra, Chamba and Bilaspur

Hans Herrli instead claims there were five provinces of the Sikh Empire, namely Lahore, Multan, Peshawar, Derajat, and Jammu and Hill States.

=== Religious policy ===
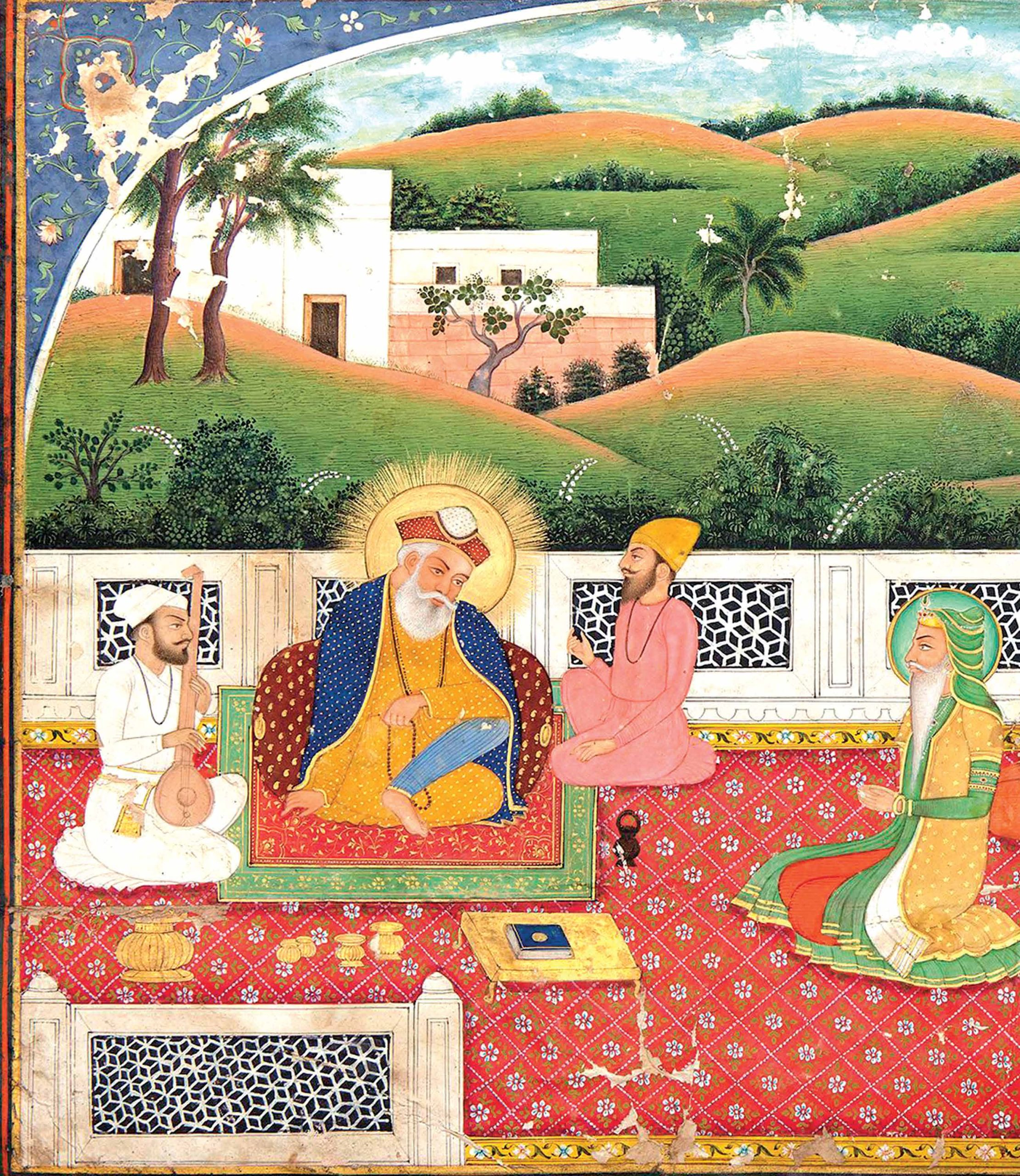
Maharaja Ranjit Singh seeking the sanctuary of Guru Nanak, c. 1830

The Sikh Empire allowed men from religions other than their own to rise to commanding positions of authority.

The Fakir brothers were trusted personal advisors and assistants as well as close friends to Ranjit Singh, particularly Fakir Azizuddin, who would serve in the positions of foreign minister of the empire and translator for the maharaja, and played important roles in such important events as the negotiations with the British, during which he convinced Ranjit Singh to maintain diplomatic ties with the British and not to go to war with them in 1808, as British troops were moved along the Sutlej in pursuance of the British policy of confining Ranjit Singh to the north of the river, and setting the Sutlej as the dividing boundary between the Sikh and British empires; negotiating with Dost Muhammad Khan during his unsuccessful attempt to retake Peshawar, and ensuring the succession of the throne during the Maharaja's last days in addition to caretaking after a stroke, as well as occasional military assignments throughout his career. The Fakir brothers were introduced to the Maharaja when their father, Ghulam Muhiuddin, a physician, was summoned by him to treat an eye ailment soon after his capture of Lahore.

The other Fakir brothers were Imamuddin, one of his principal administrative officers, and Nuruddin, who served as home minister and personal physician, were also granted jagirs by the Maharaja.

Every year, while at Amritsar, Ranjit Singh visited shrines of holy people of other faiths, including several Muslim saints, which did not offend even the most religious Sikhs of his administration. As relayed by Fakir Nuruddin, orders were issued to treat people of all faith groups, occupations, and social levels equally and in accordance with the doctrines of their faith, per the Shastras and the Quran, as well as local authorities like judges and panches (local elder councils), as well as banning forcible possession of others' land or of inhabited houses to be demolished. There were special courts for Muslims which ruled in accordance to Muslim law in personal matters, and common courts preceded over by judicial officers which administered justice under the customary law of the districts and socio-ethnic groups, and were open to all who wanted to be governed by customary religious law, whether Hindu, Sikh, or Muslim.

One of Ranjit Singh's first acts after the 1799 capture of Lahore was to revive the offices of the hereditary Qazis and Muftis which had been prevalent in Mughal times. Qazi Nizamuddin was appointed to decide marital issues among Muslims, while Muftis Mohammad Shahpuri and Sadulla Chishti were entrusted with powers to draw up title-deeds relating to transfers of immovable property. The old mohalladari system was reintroduced with each mahallah, or neighbourhood subdivision, placed under the charge of one of its members. The office of Kotwal, or prefect of police, was conferred upon a Muslim, Imam Bakhsh.

Generals were also drawn from a variety of communities, along with prominent Sikh generals like Hari Singh Nalwa, Fateh Singh Dullewalia, Nihal Singh Atariwala, Chattar Singh Attariwalla, and Fateh Singh Kalianwala; Hindu generals included Misr Diwan Chand and Dewan Mokham Chand Nayyar, his son, and his grandson; and Muslim generals included Ilahi Bakhsh and Mian Ghaus Khan; one general, Balbhadra Kunwar, was a Nepalese Gurkha, and European generals included Jean-Francois Allard, Jean-Baptiste Ventura, and Paolo Avitabile. other notable generals of the Sikh Khalsa Army were Veer Singh Dhillon, Sham Singh Attariwala, Mahan Singh Mirpuri, and Zorawar Singh Kahluria, among others.

The appointment of key posts in public offices was based on merit and loyalty, regardless of the social group or religion of the appointees, both in and around the court, and in higher as well as lower posts. Key posts in the civil and military administration were held by members of communities from all over the empire and beyond, including Sikhs, Muslims, Khatris, Brahmins, Dogras, Rajputs, Pashtuns, Europeans, and Americans, among others, and worked their way up the hierarchy to attain merit. Dhian Singh, the prime minister, was a Dogra, whose brothers Gulab Singh and Suchet Singh served in the high-ranking administrative and military posts, respectively. Brahmins like finance minister Raja Dina Nath, Sahib Dyal, and others also served in financial capacities.

Muslims in prominent positions included the Fakir brothers, Qazi Nizamuddin, and Mufti Muhammad Shah, among others. Among the top-ranking Muslim officers there were two ministers, one governor and several district officers; there were 41 high-ranking Muslim officers in the army, including two generals and several colonels, and 92 Muslims were senior officers in the police, judiciary, legal department and supply and store departments. In artillery, Muslims represented over 50% of the numbers while the cavalry had some 10% Muslims from among the troopers.

Thus, the government was run by an elite corps drawn from many communities, giving the empire the character of a secular system of government, even when built on theocratic foundations.

A ban on cow slaughter, which can be related to Hindu sentiments, was universally imposed in the empire. Ranjit Singh also donated large amounts of gold for the plating of the Kashi Vishwanath Temple's dome.

The Sikhs attempted not to offend the prejudices of Muslims, noted Baron von Hügel, the Austrian botanist and explorer, yet the Sikhs were described as harsh. In this regard, Masson's explanation is perhaps the most pertinent: "Though compared to the Afghans, the Sikhs were mild and exerted a protecting influence, yet no advantages could compensate to their Mohammedan subjects, the idea of subjection to infidels, and the prohibition to slay kine, and to repeat the azan, or 'summons to prayer'."

According to Chitralekha Zutshi and William Roe Polk, Sikh governors adopted policies that alienated the Muslim population such as the ban on cow slaughter and the azan (the Islamic call to prayer), the seizure of mosques as property of the state, and imposed ruinous taxes on Kashmiri Muslims causing a famine in 1832. In addition, begar (forced labour) was imposed by the Sikh administration to facilitate the supply of materials to the imperial army, a policy that was augmented by the successive Dogra rulers. These policies led the Kashmiri Muslim population to emigrate en masse to more lenient neighbouring regions, particularly Ladakh. As a symbolic assertion of power, the Sikhs regularly desecrated Muslim places of worship, including closing of the Jamia Masjid of Srinagar and the conversion of the Badshahi Mosque in Lahore to an ammunition store and horse stable, but the empire still maintained Persian administrative institutions and court etiquette; the Sikh silver rupees were minted on the Mughal standard with Persian legends.

Christian missionaries had been active in the Punjab even prior to the dissolution of the empire in 1849.

== Demography ==
Religions in Khalsa Empire (1800s)
Religions	Percent
Islam	69%
Hinduism	24%
Sikhism	6%
others	1%

The population of the Sikh empire during the time of Ranjit Singh's rule was estimated to be around 12 million people. There were 8.4 million Muslims, 2.88 million Hindus and 722,000 Sikhs.

The religious demography of the empire is estimated to have been just over 10% to 12% Sikh, 80% Muslim, and just under 10% Hindu. Surjit Hans gave different numbers by retrospectively projecting the 1881 census, putting Muslims at 51%, Hindus at 40% and Sikhs at around 8%, the remaining 1% being Europeans. The population was 3.5 million in 1831, according to Amarinder Singh's The Last Sunset: The Rise and Fall of the Lahore Durbar. Hans Herrli in The Coins of the Sikhs estimated the total population of the empire to be around 5.35 million during 1838. Meanwhile, Jean-Marie Lafont estimates that the population of the empire consisted of 15 million people.

An estimated 90% of the Sikh population at the time, and more than half of the total population, was concentrated in the upper Bari, Jalandhar, and upper Rachna Doabs, and in the areas of their greatest concentration formed about one third of the population in the 1830s; half of the Sikh population of this core region was in the area covered by the later districts of Lahore and Amritsar.

In 1839, a major pogrom, called the Allahdad, targeted the local Jews of Mashhad in Qajar Persia. A group of Persian Jewish refugees from Mashhad, escaping persecution back home in Qajar Persia, settled in the Sikh Empire around the year 1839. Most of the Jewish families settled in Rawalpindi (specifically in the Babu Mohallah neighbourhood) and Peshawar. Most of these Jews would leave for the Dominion of India during the partition of 1947.

== Economy ==
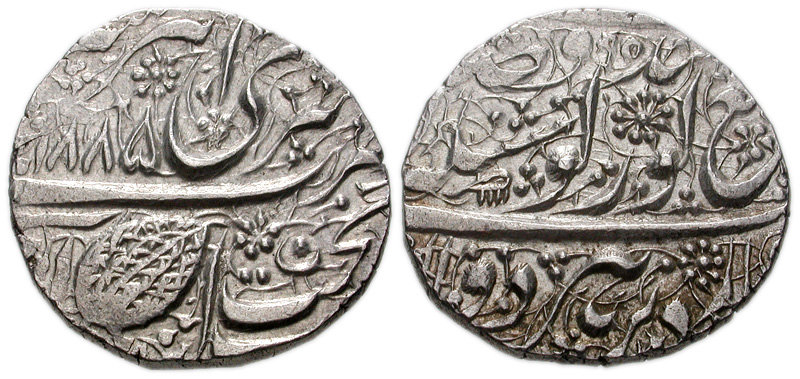
Nanakshahi coins of the Sikh Empire

=== Revenue ===
Revenue in Rupees, 1844
Sr	Particulars		Revenue in Rupees
1	Land Revenue		
1.a		Tributary States	5,65,000
1.b		Farms	1,79,85,000
1.c		Eleemosynary	20,00,000
1.d		Jagirs	95,25,000
2	Customs		24,00,000
	Total		3,24,75,000

Land revenue was the main source of income, accounting for about 70% of the state's income. Besides this, the other sources of income were customs, excises and monopolies.

== Timeline ==
- 1699: Formation of the Khalsa by Guru Gobind Singh.
- 1710–1716: Banda Singh defeats the Mughals and declares Khalsa rule.
- 1716–1738: Mughals take back territorial control for two decades but Sikhs engage in guerrilla warfare
- 1733–1735: The Khalsa accepts, only to reject, the confederal status given by the Mughals.
- 1738–1757: Nader Shah's invasion of India; Afghan invasion by Ahmad Shah Durrani
- 1761–1767: Recapture of Punjab region by Afghan in Third Battle of Panipat
- 1763–1774: Charat Singh Sukerchakia, Misldar of Sukerchakia misl, establishes himself in Gujranwala.
- 1764–1783: Baba Baghel Singh, Misldar of Singh Krora Misl, imposes taxes on the Mughals.
- 1783: Sikh capture of Delhi and the Red Fort from the Mughals
- 1773: Ahmad Shah Durrani dies and his son Timur Shah launches several invasions into Punjab.
- 1774–1790: Maha Singh becomes Misldar of the Sukerchakia misl.
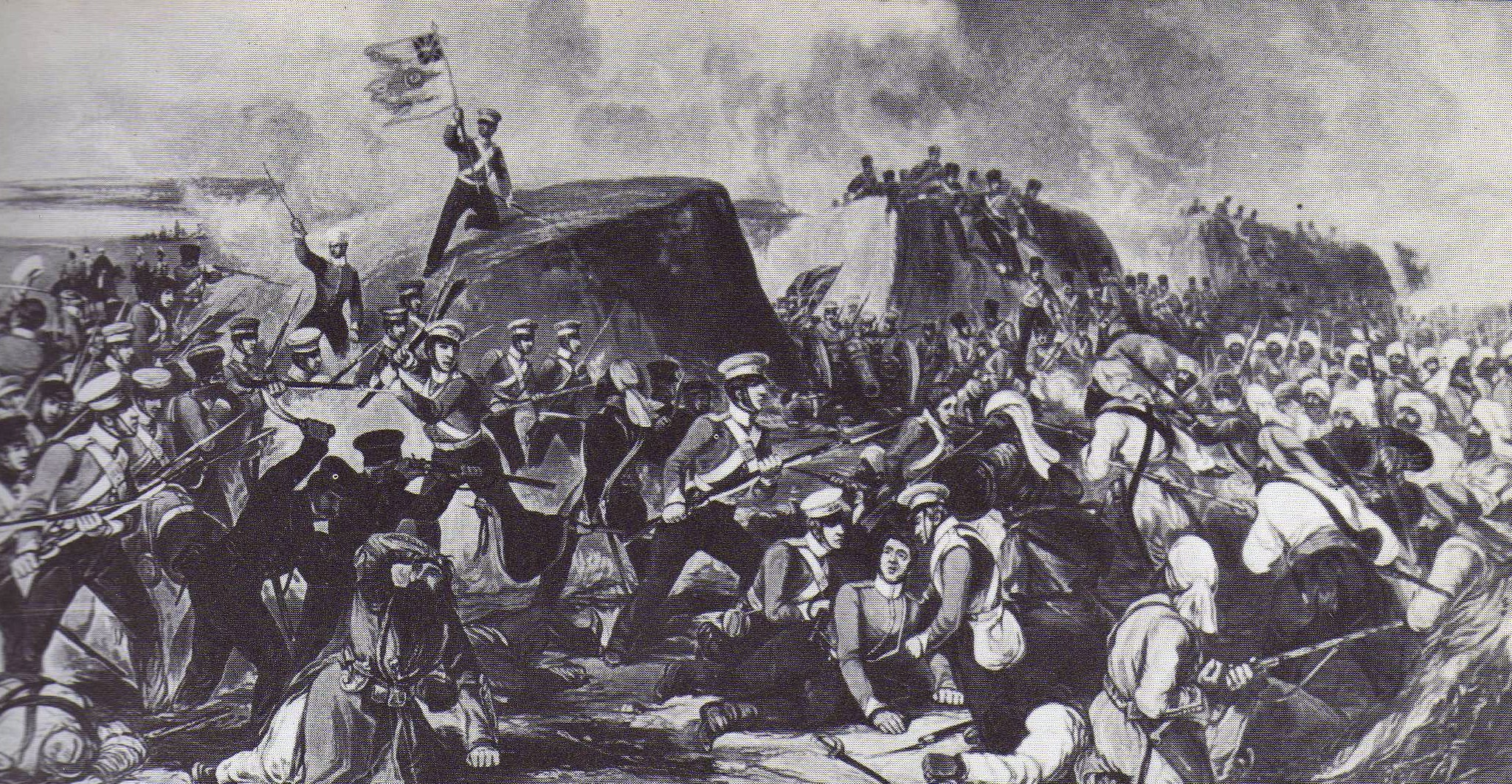
  Contemporary painting of the Battle of Sobraon in 1846.
- 1790–1801: Ranjit Singh becomes Misldar of the Sukerchakia misl.
- 1799, formation of the Sikh Khalsa Army
- 12 April 1801 (coronation) – 27 June 1839: reign of Maharaja Ranjit Singh.
- March 1809 – August 1809: Nepal–Sikh War
- 20 February 1810: Siege of Multan (1810)
- 1 June 1813: Ranjit Singh is given the Kohinoor Diamond.
- 13 July 1813: Battle of Attock, the Sikh Empire's first significant victory over the Durrani Empire.
- – 2 March June 1818: Battle of Multan, the 2nd battle in the Afghan–Sikh wars.
- 3 July 1819: Battle of Shopian
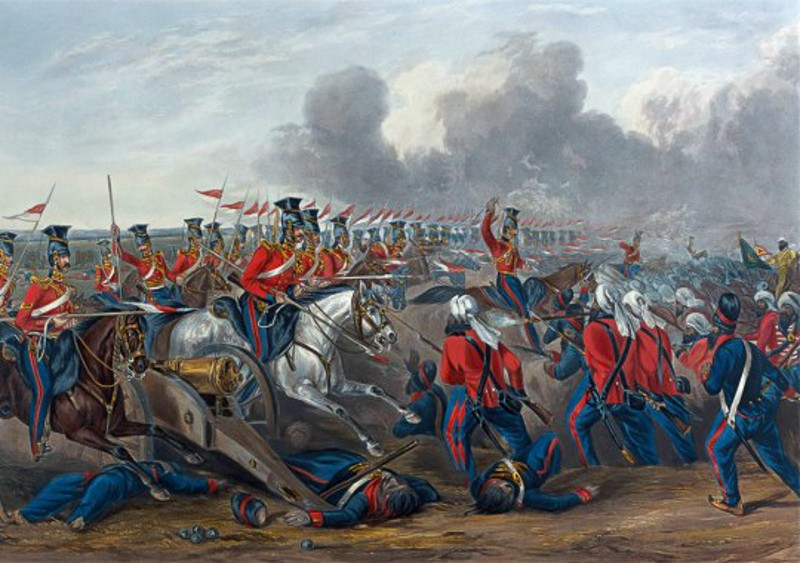
  The charge of the British 16th Lancers at Aliwal on 28 January 1846, during the First Anglo-Sikh War
- 14 March 1823: Battle of Nowshera
- 30 April 1837: Battle of Jamrud
- 27 June 1839 – 5 November 1840: Reign of Maharaja Kharak Singh
- 5 November 1840 – 18 January 1841: Chand Kaur is briefly Regent
- 18 January 1841 – 15 September 1843: Reign of Maharaja Sher Singh
- May 1841 – August 1842: Sino-Sikh war
- 15 September 1843 – 31 March 1849: Reign of Maharaja Duleep Singh
- 1845–1846: First Anglo-Sikh War
- 1848–1849: Second Anglo-Sikh War

== List of rulers ==
S. No.	Name	Portrait	Birth and death		Reign			Note	
1	Maharaja Ranjit Singh		13 November 1780 (Gujranwala)	27 June 1839 (Lahore)	12 April 1801	27 June 1839	38 years, 76 days	Founder of the empire	Stroke
2	Maharaja Kharak Singh		22 February 1801 (Lahore)	5 November 1840 (Lahore)	27 June 1839	8 October 1839	103 days	Son of Ranjit Singh	Poisoning
3	Maharaja Nau Nihal Singh		11 February 1820 (Lahore)	6 November 1840 (Lahore)	8 October 1839	6 November 1840	1 year, 29 days	Son of Kharak Singh	Assassinated
	Maharani Chand Kaur (regent)		1802 (Fatehgarh Churian)	11 June 1842 (Lahore)	6 November 1840	18 January 1841	73 days	Wife of Kharak Singh	Abdicated
4	Maharaja Sher Singh		4 December 1807 (Batala)	15 September 1843 (Lahore)	18 January 1841	15 September 1843	2 years, 240 days	Son of Ranjit Singh	Assassinated
5	Maharaja Duleep Singh		6 September 1838 (Lahore)	22 October 1893 (Paris)	15 September 1843	29 March 1849	5 years, 195 days	Son of Ranjit Singh	Exiled
	Maharani Jind Kaur (regent; nominal)		1817 (Gujranwala)	1 August 1863 (Kensington)	15 September 1843	29 March 1849	5 years, 195 days	Wife of Ranjit Singh	Exiled

=== Viziers/Wazirs (prime-ministers or chamberlains) ===
- Khushal Singh Jamadar (1799–1818)
- Dhian Singh Dogra (1818–1843)
- Hira Singh Dogra (1843–1845)
- Jawahar Singh (wazir) (14 May 1845 – 21 September 1845)
- Lal Singh (1845–1846)
- Gulab Singh (31 January – 9 March 1846)

=== Nizams/Diwans (provincial governors) ===
==== Kashmir ====
The nominal and acting governors of Kashmir during Sikh-rule and their tenures are as follows:

- Diwan Moti Ram (1st term), end of 1819 – 1820
- Hari Singh Nalwa, 1820–1821
- Diwan Moti Ram (2nd term), December 1821 – spring of 1825
  - Gurmak Singh, 1825 (acting governor)
- Diwan Chuni Lal, 1825 – end of 1826
- Diwan Kirpa Ram, early 1827 – 1830
- Maha Singh, 1830 (governor for one month after Kirpa Ram)
- Bhima Singh Ardali, summer 1830 – 1831
- Kanwar Sher Singh, 1831–1834
  - Diwan Vesaka Singh, 1831–1832 (acting governor on behalf of Sher Singh)
  - Shaikh Gholam Muhyi Addin & Jamadar Kushal Singh, 1832–1834 (acting governors for Sher Singh)
- Mihan Singh Kumedan, July 1834 – 17 April 1841
- Shaikh Gholam Muhyi Addin, April 1841 – 1845
- Shaikh Imam-ud-Din, 1845 – November 1847

==== Multan ====
- Several temporary Sikh governors of Multan, 1818–1820
- Diwan Sawan Mal Chopra, 1820–1844
- Diwan Mulraj Chopra, 1844–1849

==== Hazara ====
- Hukma Singh Chimni, 1814–1819
- Diwan Ram Dayal, 1819–1820
- Amar Singh Majithia, 1820–1822
- Hari Singh Nalwa, 1822–1837
- Mahan Singh Hazarawala, 1837–1838
- Tej Singh, 1838–1844
- Arbel Singh, 1844 – ?
- Chattar Singh Attariwalla, 1848–1849

==== Peshawar ====
- Hari Singh Nalwa, 1834–1837
- Paolo Avitabile, 1837 – ?

==== Jalandhar Doab ====
- Desa Singh Majithia, ? – 1832
- Shaikh Ghulam Muhy-ud-Din, 1834–1841
- Shaikh Imam-ud-Din, 1841–1845

==== Kangra ====
- Desa Singh Majithia, 1809–1832
- Lehna Singh Majithia, 1832 – ?

== Family tree ==
Family tree of the Maharajas of the Sikh Empire

Jind Kaur^{(7)} r. 1847; Regent; 1843–1847	Datar Kaur	Ranjit Singh^{(1)} r. 1801–1839
Duleep Singh^{(6)} r. 1843–1849	Kharak Singh^{(2)} r. 1839	Chand Kaur^{(4)} r. 1840–1841
Nau Nihal Singh^{(3)} r. 1839–1840

Mehtab Kaur
Sher Singh^{(5)} r. 1841–1843

== Gallery ==
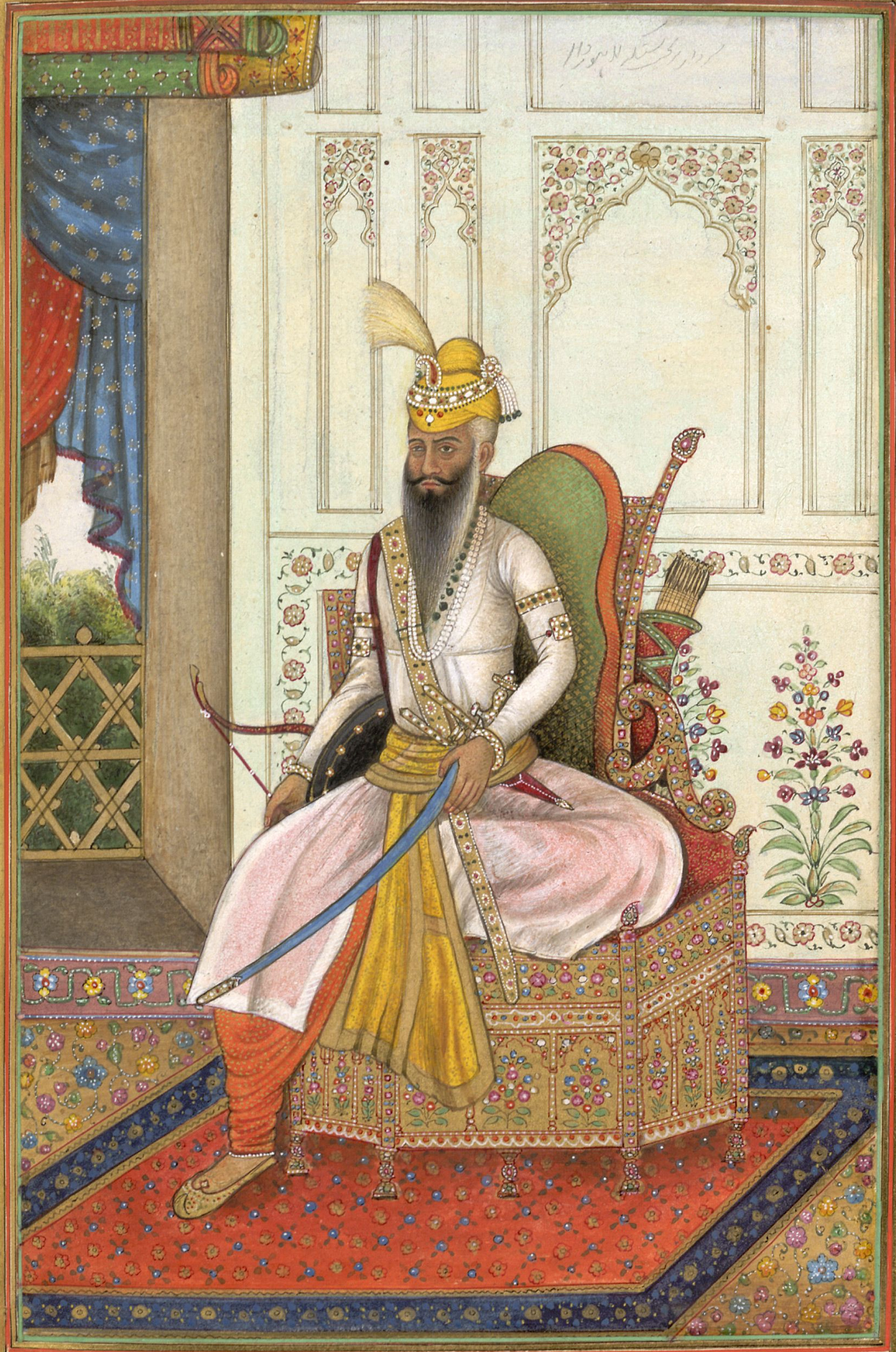
Ranjit Singh, c. 1830.

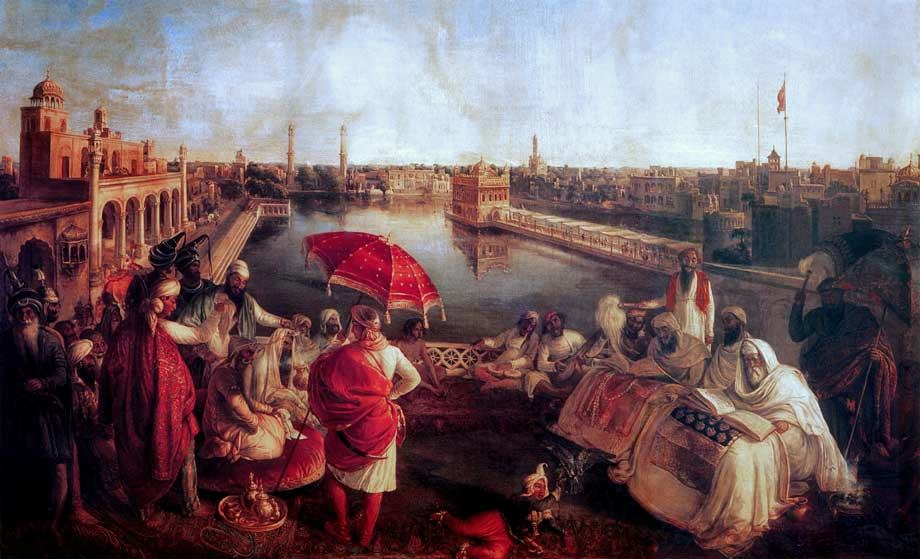
Ranjit Singh listening to Guru Granth Sahib being recited near the Akal Takht and Golden Temple, Amritsar, Punjab, India.

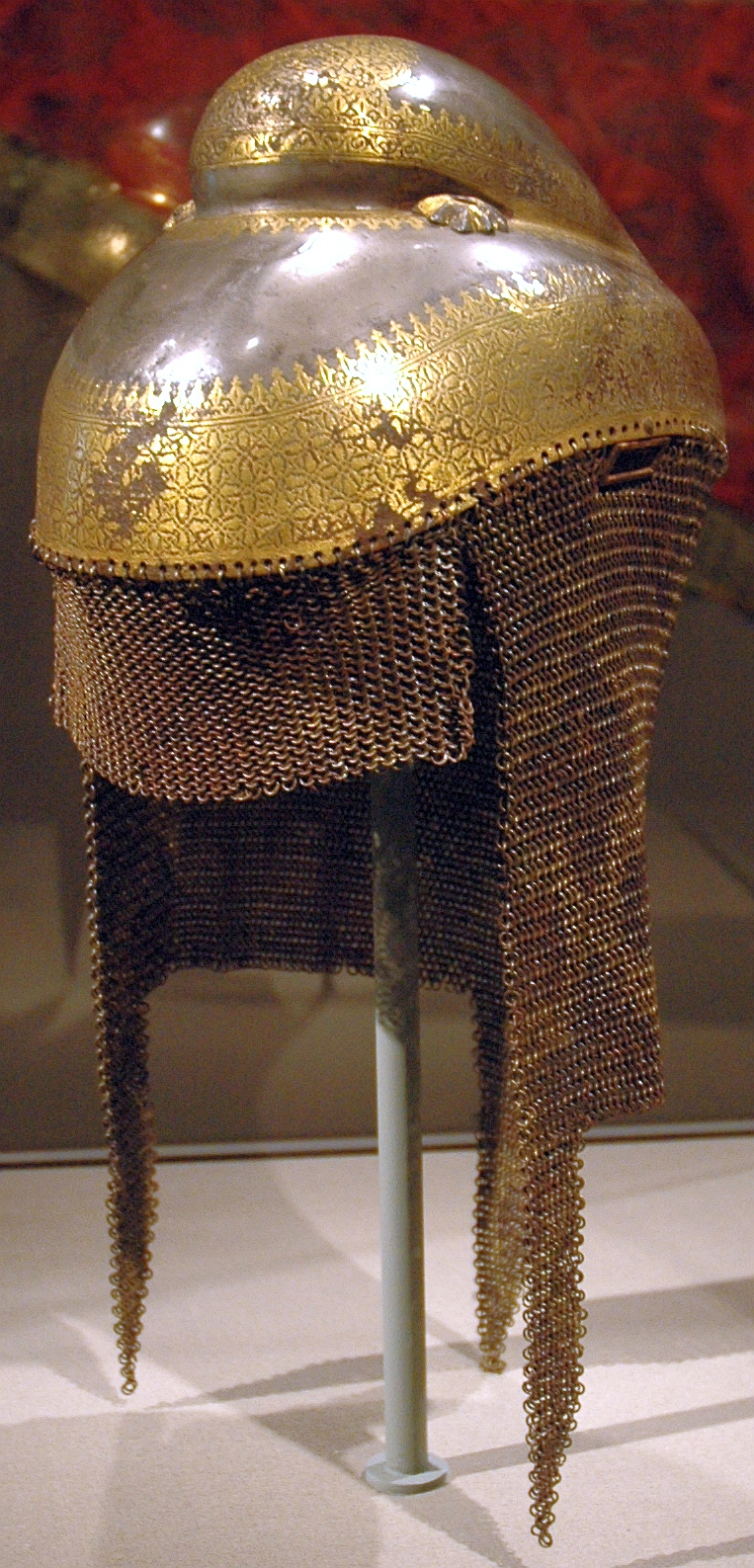
Sikh warrior helmet with butted mail neckguard, 1820–1840, iron overlaid with gold with mail neckguard of iron and brass

Preceded by Sukerchakia Misl	Sikh Empire; 1799–1849	Succeeded by British Punjab

== See also ==
- History of Punjab
- History of Pakistan
- Sikh period in Lahore
- History of India
- Kapurthala State
- Mughal Empire
- Sikh Khalsa Army
