= Lau (clan) =

Lau (also spelled Lav) is one of the seven Mohyal Brahmin clans of Punjab.

== Origin and history ==
=== Early history ===
LAU (Vasishtha)

Lau Mohyal belongs to Vasishtha gotra. Vasishtha, a Manas Putra of Brahma, was thrice born. In the first birth, he was son-in-law of Kashyap Rishi, being married to his daughter Arundhati. He too perished in the Daksha-yaga and was born again from the Yajna-kund of the Brahma. He was born from a pot, for the third time, as oar of Mitra Varuna. He was the family priest of Suryavanshis and purohit to the Raghus or Raghavas from whom Sri Rama descended. He clashed with Vishvamitra over the fabled Kamadhenu cow and defeated him. He was the author of Vasishtha Smriti, Vasishtha Puran and other granthas.

Kripacharya, son of Gautam Rishi and brother-in-law of Dronacharya, was also in the line of the mythical ancestors of the Laus.

In Mohyals' recorded history, however, there is no mention of the Lau clan until around 1000 CE. According to Mohyals' own historians and their folklore, the clan came into prominence by establishing a dheri (fiefdom) at Bajwada near modern-day Kangra in Himachal Pradesh on the border with Hoshiarpur, Punjab. In the Middle Ages Bajwada was an important town, as reflected by the prominence of its mention in Mughal records. Various Mohyal ballads, especially the Vishav Rai Niti, extol the feats and fierce swordsmanship of the early rulers of Bajwada especially Vishav Rai and Ballal Sen, and consist of verses that also glorify the damages inflicted by their armies on the Ghaznavid sultans, when the latter were on their way to or returning from raids of other Indian cities.

Many names of the Lau clan in Mohyal folklore and records closely match names from the Sena dynasty of Bengal, like Ballal Sen and Lau Sen. That, and the coinciding of the Lau clan's appearance in Punjab with the period when the Senas held territories North of Delhi, has led some historians to assert that the Laus descended from among the Senas and are named after Lau Sen, consistent with the known phenomenon of a new clan or caste name coming into being with a notable ancestor. The name Lau Sen is famous in Bengali folklore as well, and consistent with Mohyal tradition the Senas were also of Brahmin lineage but in a Kshatriya role.

India's most decorated Army General, Zorawar Chand Bakshi was from the Lau clan.
