= Khushal Singh Jamadar =

Lord Chamberlain of Sikh Empire

Raja Khushal Singh Jamadar
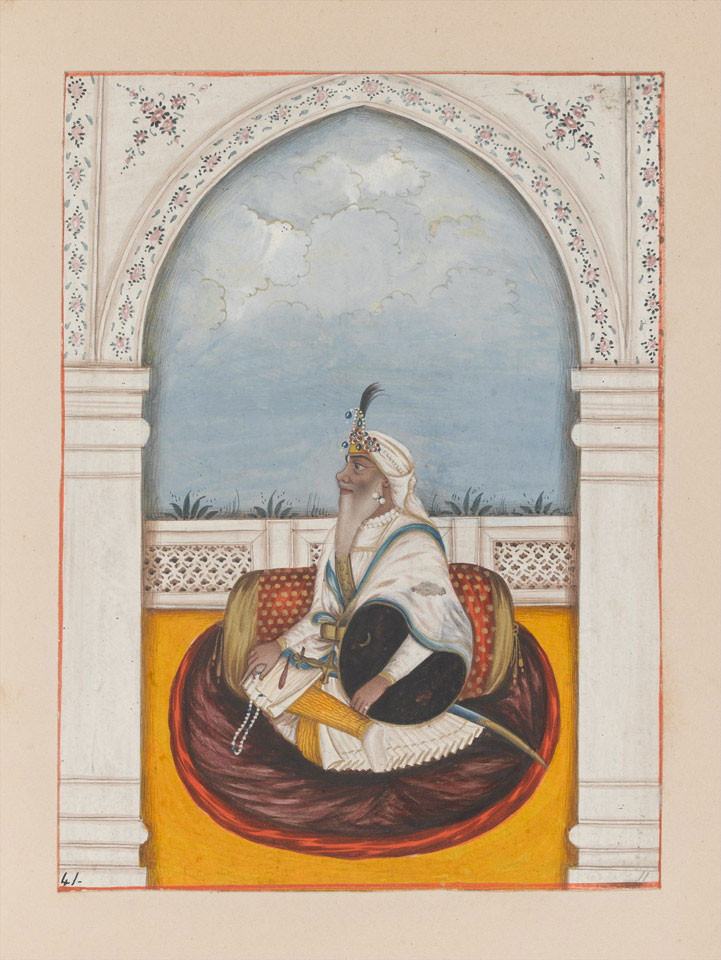
- Watercolour of Jamadar Khushal Singh, Company artist, Punjab, ca.1865
- Born: Khushal Ram; 1790; Ikari, Sardhana Pargana (Present-day Meerut, Western Uttar Pradesh)
- Died: 17 June 1844 (aged 53–54); Lahore, Sikh Empire (Present-day Punjab, Pakistan)
- Children: Ram Singh; Kishan Singh; Bhagwan Singh
- Relatives: Misr Hargobind (father); Ram Singh (brother); Misr Niddha (brother); Tej Singh (nephew)
- Military career
- Allegiance: Sikh Empire
- Branch: Sikh Khalsa Army
- Service years: 1807 - 1844
- Rank: Wazir-e-Azam (till 1818); Chamberlain; Military officer
- Nickname: Khushala
- Known for: Military expeditions in areas of Kashmir (1814); The reduction of southwestern Punjab; Mukerian (1816); Multan (1818); Dera Ghazi Khan (1819); Derajat (1820); Dera Ismail Khan (1821); Leiah (1821); Mankera (1822); Peshawar (1823); The reduction of Hill States; Kangra (1828)
- Awards: Jamadarji

Khushal Singh Jamadar (1790 – 17 June 1844) was a military officer and chamberlain of the Sikh Empire. He was conferred the title of Raja for his conquest of Dera Ghazi Khan, Kangra and other military expeditions. He was a notable figure of the state.

== Early life ==
He was born in 1790, in a Gaur Brahmin family of Village Ikari (Meerut, Western Uttar Pradesh), to Misr Hargobind, a shopkeeper.

== Administration and military career ==
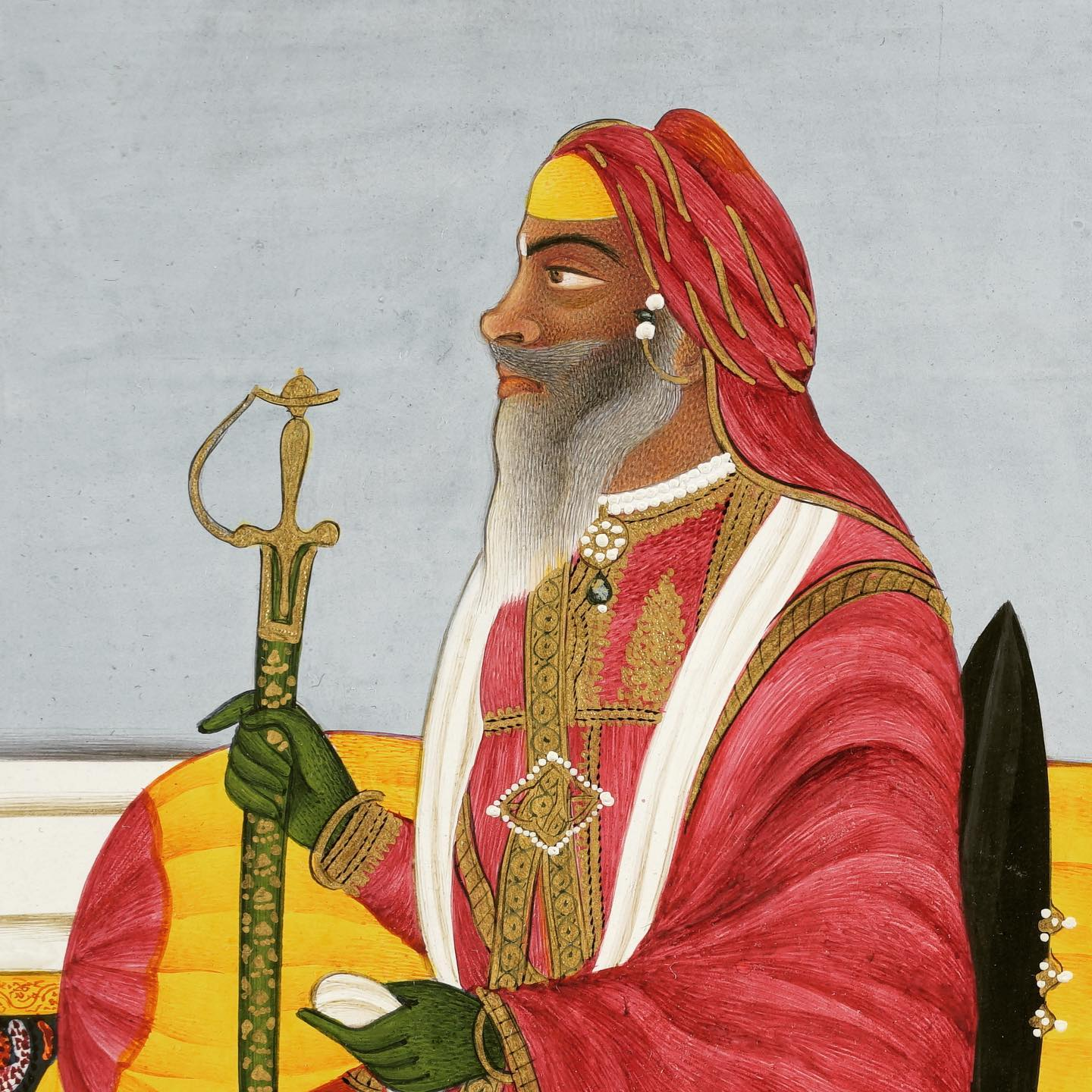
Painting of Jamadar Khushal Singh

He left his home as an adventurer at a young age to seek his fortune in Lahore, eventually joining the Sikh army as a soldier in Dhaunkal Singh wala's regiment in 1807.

Khushal Singh advanced more with time and was appointed personal attendant (Khidmat-gar) to Maharaja Ranjit Singh, rising through the ranks to become lord chamberlain (Darogha'i-Deorhi'i-Mu'alla; which became office of prime minister [Wazir] under Dhian Singh), an office he held for almost 15 years with a temporary break in 1818. This position commanded great influence and authority, as Khushal Singh was master of royal ceremonies and superintendent of both the royal palace and the Darbar. No one could have access to the sovereign or enter the palace without his prior permission.

In addition to his administrative duties, Khushal Singh excelled as a soldier, serving in various military expeditions throughout the region, including Kashmir (1814), Mukerian (1816), Multan (1818), Dera Ghazi Khan (1819), Derajat (1820), Dera Ismail Khan (1821), Leiah (1821), Mankera (1822), Peshawar (1823), and Kangra (1828) amid others.

== Death ==
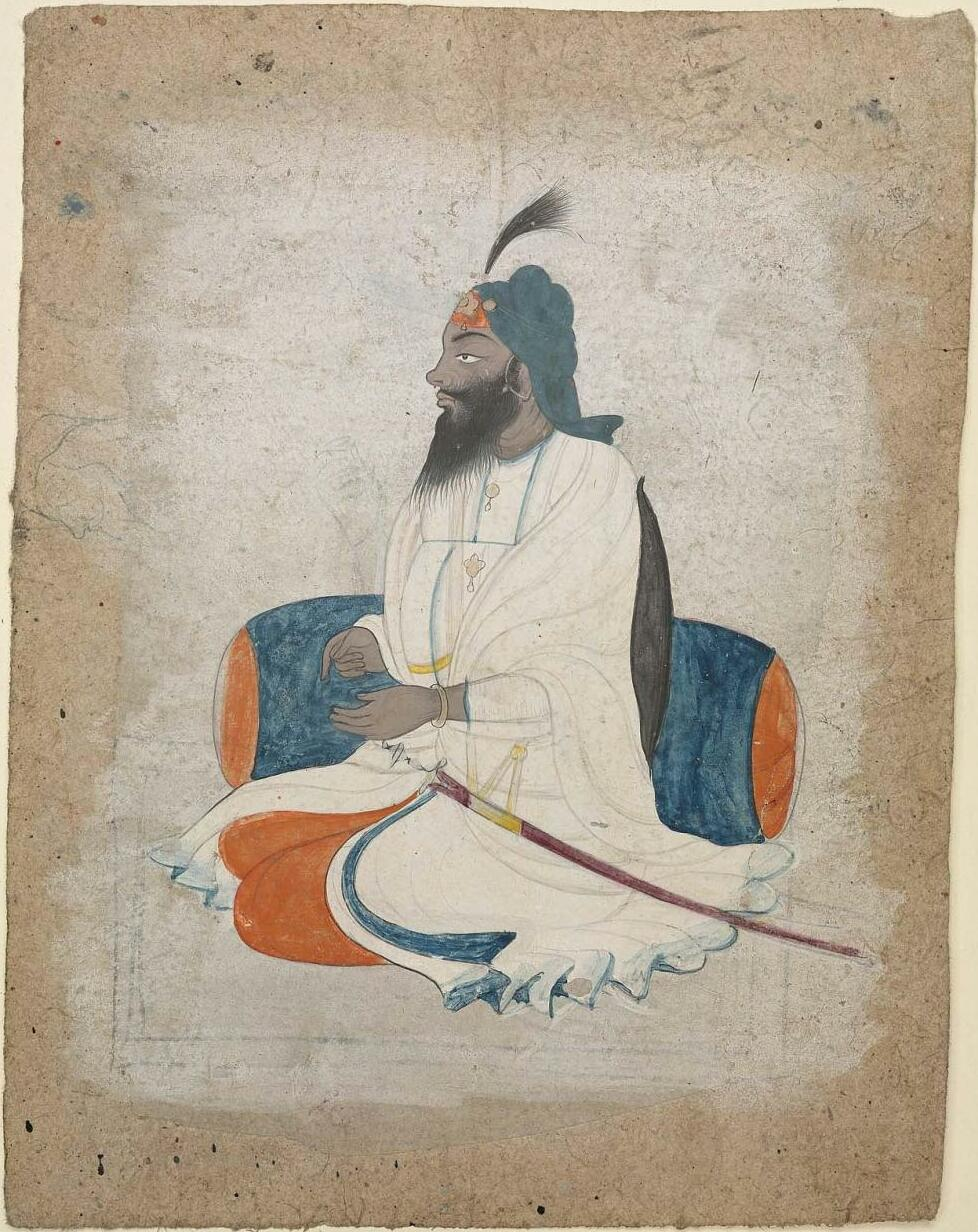
Portrait of Jamadar Khushal Singh

Khushal Singh distributed all his belongings by way of charity to deserving and needy ones, and died on 17 June 1844. His Samadhi was made in his haveli's garden in Lahore, where his nephew Teja Singh's Samadhi also lies.

== Legacy ==
Descendants of his brother became rulers of Sheikhupura and Raja Dhayan Singh (son of Raja Fateh Singh), was the last ruler of Sheikhupura.

== See also ==
- List of generals of Ranjit Singh
- Sikh Empire
