= Bali clan =

Indian clan

The Bali are a clan of the Mohyal Brahmin community, who originated from North India, particularly the states of Jammu and Kashmir, Punjab, Himachal Pradesh and Delhi (after the partition).

The Issar/Ishar/Isher clan is a prominent sub-branch of the Bali clan of Mohyal Brahmins, formed in the 12th century after a marriage dispute between the queen of Malot and the children of Rai Tirlok Nath Bali, a notable Mohyal warrior who was one of the seven warriors of Jhelum called to Raja Jayachandra's Rajasuya Yajna in 1191 CE; notable members include actor Puneet Issar.

== Early history ==
The Mohyals were once priests that resided near the ancient Saraswati river, that used to flow from the Himalayas and down to the Arabian Sea. However during the Vedic Period, Bhagwan Parashurama, a famous warrior sage militarised these priests into fierce warriors that would go on to unify the areas of northwestern India and defend it from many invasions.
