= Tej Singh =

Sikh Warrior who Commanded sikh khalsa Army during First Anglo Sikh War

Raja Tej Singh
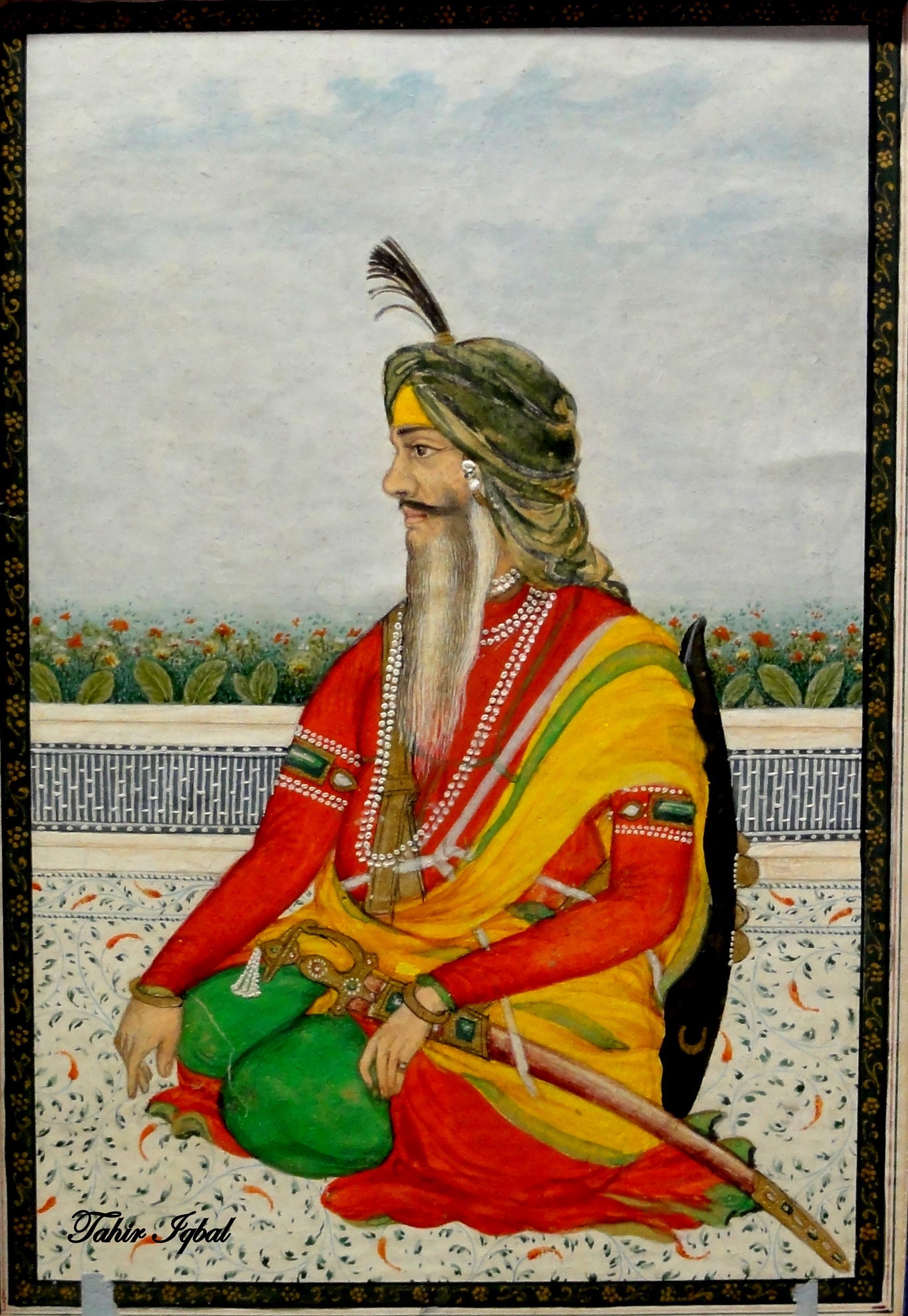
- Miniature painting of a seated Raja Tej Singh with a sword on his lap and shield on his back

Governor of Hazara and Peshawar
- In office 1838–1844
- Monarch: Ranjit Singh; Kharak Singh; Nau Nihal Singh; Sher Singh; Duleep Singh
- Preceded by: Mahan Singh Hazarawala
- Succeeded by: Arbel Singh

Personal details
- Born: Tej Ram; 1799
- Died: 4 December 1862 (aged 62–63)
- Relations: Misr Niddha (father) Harbans Singh (brother)
- Children: Narinder Singh

Military service
- Allegiance: Sikh Empire
- Branch/service: Sikh Khalsa Army
- Rank: General
- Commands: Diwan of Peshawar Raja of Sailkot Head the Council of Regency of the minor Dalip Singh
- Battles/wars: First Anglo-Sikh War

Tej Singh (1799 – 4 December 1862; or Raja Teja Singh) was a Sikh commander in the Sikh Empire. He was appointed as commander-in-chief of the Sikh Khalsa Army during the First Anglo-Sikh War betraying the army he was supposed to lead.

In return for his loyalty to the East India Company, it made Tej Singh Raja of Sialkot and appointed him to head the Council of Regency on behalf of the minor Duleep Singh. He was one of the six signatories to the 1849 Treaty of Lahore, which agreed to the surrender of the Koh-i-Noor diamond by the Maharaja of Lahore to the Queen of England. All the signatories, on behalf of the minor Duleep Singh, endorsed the treaty in return for being permitted to retain their jagirs.

== Biography ==
=== Early life ===
Tej Singh was born as Tej Ram in 1799 into a Gaur Brahmin family. His father was Misr Niddha of Meerut district, who was commander of the Sikh Khalsa Army. He was a relative of Jamadar Khushal Singh. He first began working in the court of the Lahore Durbar in 1812. In 1816, he underwent the Pahul and was rechristened as Tej Singh.

=== Military and administrative career ===
After proving his worth as a soldier during the invasions of Kashmir in 1813, 1814, and 1819, alongside the operations against Mankera, Leiah, and Derajat, he was promoted to the rank of general in the Sikh army in 1818. He played a role in the Peshawar operation of 1823, where he served as operational commander. During this campaign, he took part in the battle of Teri. By 1831, twenty-two battalions of the regular Sikh army came under his command. In 1839, he assisted with a Colonel Wade's joint-invasion of Afghanistan and was based in Peshawar.

=== Governorship of Peshawar ===
General Tej Singh was the Governor of Hazara and Peshawar from 1838 to 1844. With the death of Maharaja Ranjit Singh in June 1839, and with the outbreak of the First Afghan War, Tej Singh found it necessary to pay undivided attention to Peshawar. He requested that a separate Governor be appointed to Hazara, so the Lahore Durbar named Arbel Singh Deputy Governor and handed him the sole charge of the affairs of Yusafzai. Arbel Singh commenced his new role at the onset of 1841.

=== Court politics and alleged betrayal ===
After the death of Maharaja Ranjit Singh, the Sikh court became fractious and the various agents acted at cross purposes to each other.

He had considerable influence over Nau Nihal Singh. He endorsed Chand Kaur's regency after the sudden death of Nau Nihal Singh.

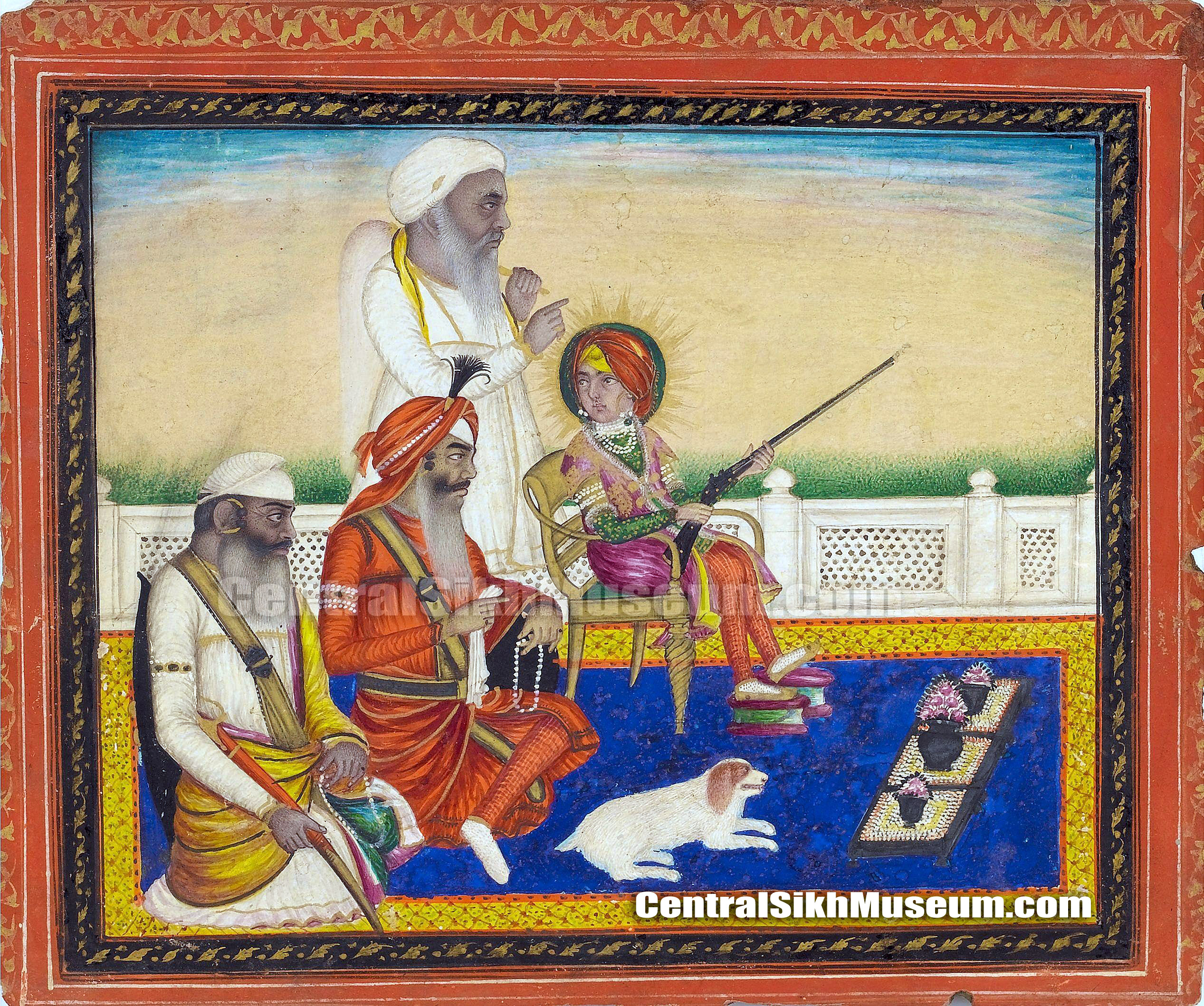
Maharaja Duleep Singh in durbar on a terrace with Labh Singh and Tej Singh and an attendant, Lahore, circa 1850

Tej Singh appears to have had loyalties to the Raja Gulab Singh of Jammu and he, along with Gulab Singh, believed it to be a mistake to be warring with the British. However, Rani Jindan, the Regent acting on behalf of the anointed prince Duleep Singh, ordered him to march the troops against the British. He did so reluctantly.

The allegation that Raja Tej Singh betrayed the Sikh army has been described by some historical accounts as a later invention intended to explain the defeats at Ferozeshah and Sobraon. One such account explicitly compares the story to other allegations of treachery used to explain military defeats, suggesting that the claim may have been created to shift blame for the outcome of the battles.

According to Harbans Singh writing in The Encyclopedia of Sikhism, his actions and commands during both Anglo-Sikh Wars were "marked by duplicity" and that he had "established secret liaison with the British". An instance revealing this duplicity is said to be his lack of action when two Sikh divisions under his command were near the vicinity of Firozpur and could have overwhelmed the locality's tiny British garrison but Tej Singh never gave the command to do so. Another example given is his conduct during the Battle of Ferozeshah fought on 21–22 December 1845, where the force he commanded had clear opportunities to strike a victory over British forces but he stopped them from doing so, ordering his forces to cease fire when the British were in a vulnerable position. He would abandon the battlefield for Lahore.

In the Battle of Sobraon fought on 10 February 1846, General Tej Singh crossed a pontoon bridge on the Sutlej river and ordered its destruction. According to historian Amar Pal Sidhu, this incident led to the defeat of the Sikh Army, possibly as intended by Tej Singh. Harbans Singh illustrates that Tej Singh also fled from the battle alongside Lal Singh, even though the tide of the battle was still not certain and either side could still win. He instructed Sham Singh Attariwala to do the same but the latter refused and fought till his death. Whilst in retreat, he ordered troops under his command to destroy boats and a tete de pont (bridgehead) to hamper the withdrawal of Sikh forces, dooming them.

After the defeat of Sikhs, the Treaty of Lahore was signed by which Kashmir was sold to Gulab Singh to pay war indemnities to the British as well as the army was regulated.

=== Later life ===
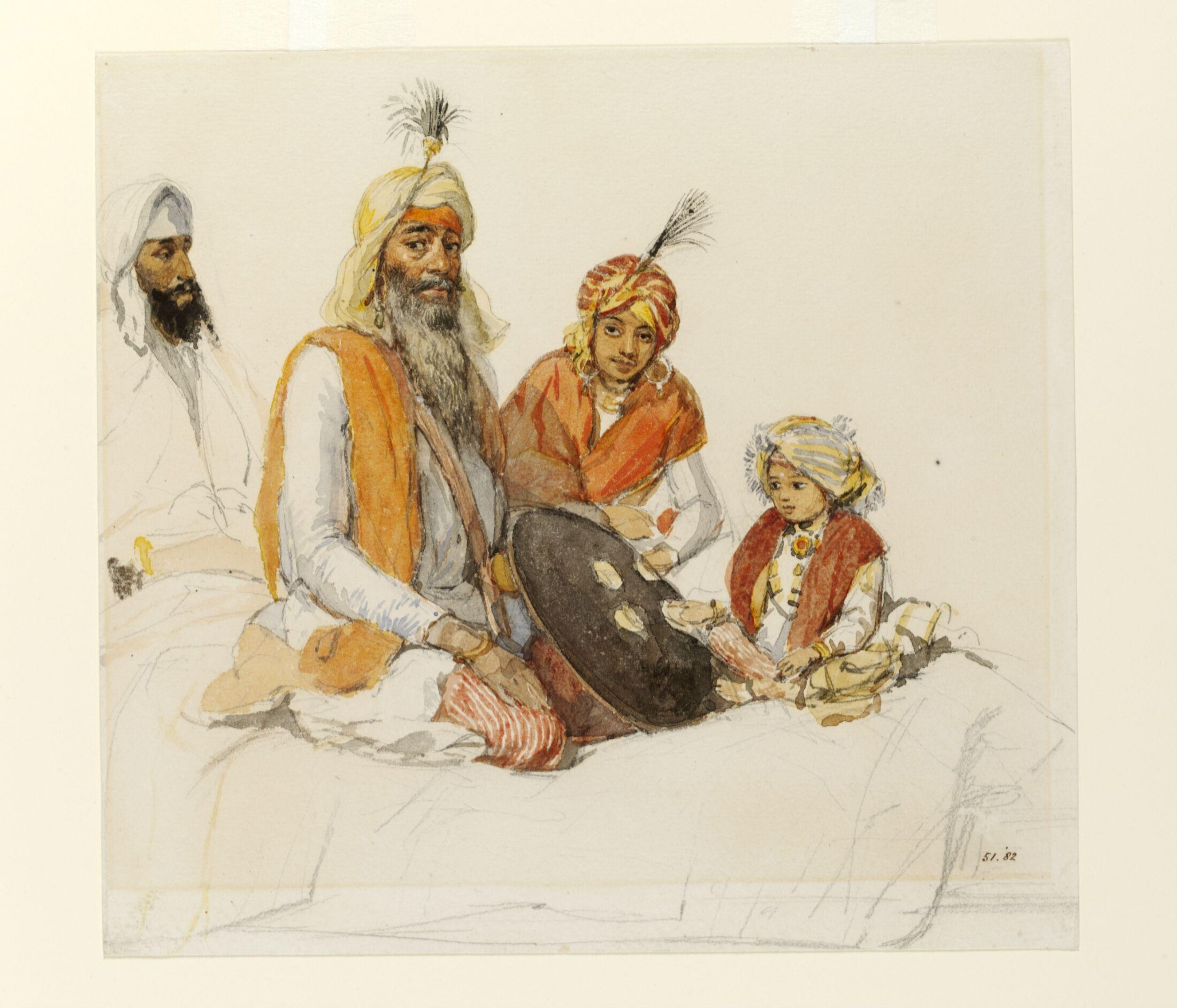
Watercolour on paper depicting Tej Singh with his son and nephew, by William Carpenter, ca.1850–57

After the demise of the Sikh Empire in 1849, he enjoyed special benefits in the new colony that the British bestowed upon him, including all "rights and privileges" he enjoyed during the rule of the Sikh Empire. He was bestowed the power of a magistrate in his estate and was given a high position with full powers for management of the Golden Temple complex in Amritsar. He supported the British plight during the Sepoy Mutiny of 1857 and sent cavalry troops to assist his British colonial masters. He was awarded the title of Raja of Batala after his dispersed jagirs were amalgamated. He died on 4 December 1862 and was succeeded by his adopted son (who was actually his brother) Harbans Singh. He had a biological son named Narinder Singh.
