= Thomas Harte Franks =

Sir Thomas Harte Franks K.C.B.
- Born: 1808; Mallow, County Cork, Ireland
- Died: 5 February 1862 (aged 54); Tetsworth, Oxfordshire, England
- Spouse(s): Matilda Kay; Rebecca Constantia Elizabeth
- Military career
- Allegiance: United Kingdom
- Branch: British Army
- Service years: 1825–1862
- Rank: Major-General
- Unit: 10th Regiment of Foot
- Conflicts: Battle of Sobraon (1846); Siege of Multan (1848); Battle of Gujrat (1849)
- Awards: Sutlej Medal; Order of the Bath

Sir Thomas Harte Franks (1808–1862), was a British military officer. He fought in the Second Anglo-Sikh War and in the Indian Rebellion of 1857.

== Early life ==
Franks was the second son of William Franks of Carrig Castle, near Mallow, County Cork. His mother was Catherine, daughter of William Hume, member of parliament for the County Wicklow, and aunt of Fitzwilliam Hume Dick, M.P. for Wicklow.

== Military service ==
Franks commissioned ensign in the 10th Regiment of Foot on 7 July 1825, and was promoted lieutenant on 26 September 1826, captain on 1 March 1839, major on 29 December 1843, and lieutenant-colonel on 28 March 1845, before he had ever seen action.

During the twenty years Franks had been with his regiment in many parts of the world, and in 1842 he accompanied it for the first time to India. He was engaged in the First Anglo-Sikh War, and the 10th Regiment was one of those that were called up to help to fill the gap caused by the heavy losses at Mudkí and Firozshah. At the battle of Sobraon the 10th Regiment was on the extreme right of the line, and carried the Sikh Army position in front of it. Franks was wounded and had a horse shot under him. He was awarded the Sobraon medal and was made a Companion of the Order of the Bath (C.B.) In the Second Anglo-Sikh War. Franks's 10th Regiment was the first British one to come up to the Siege of Multan, and Franks as one of the senior officers with the besieging force, held many independent commands.

After the siege was over, Franks joined Commander-in-Chief, India Field Marhsal Hugh Gough, 1st Viscount Gough, on 10 February 1849 and served with distinction at the decisive Battle of Gujrat on 21 February. Franks was promoted colonel on 20 June 1854, and took command of the Jalandhar brigade on 11 May 1855.

He had handed over his command, and was going home on sick leave when the mutiny of 1857 broke out. Thereupon he refused to go return to the United Kingdom of Great Britain and Ireland, and remained at Calcutta until his health was sufficiently restored to enable him to take the field. In January 1858 Franks was appointed to command the 4th infantry division in the field, with the rank of brigadier-general. This division, nearly six thousand strong, was intended to carry out a favourite scheme of Charles Canning, 1st Earl Canning, the Governor-General of India. Franks was directed to march across the north-eastern frontier of Oude, driving the mutineers before him. Franks was then to meet Sir Jung Bahadur Rana, the prime minister of Nepal, who had promised to bring a force of Goorkhas to the assistance of the British. The two corps were to co-operate in Sir Colin Campbell's operations against Lucknow at the Siege of Lucknow. This programme was successfully carried out; on 19 and 23 February Franks inflicted defeats on the rebel leader, Muhammad Hussein Nazim, at Chanda, and between Badshahganj and Sultánpur. The effect of these victories, in which Franks lost only two men killed and sixteen wounded, was, however, reduced by the severe check that he received in an attempt to take Dohrighat. Campbell was much incensed at this defeat, and after the final Capture of Lucknow he refused to give Franks another command.

== Later life ==
He returned to Britain, where he was promoted to major-general on 20 July 1858, made a Knight Commander of the Order of the Bath (K.C.B.), and given the thanks of parliament. He authored and had printed by Spottiswoode & Co. a pamphlet, "for private circulation" in England, collecting his despatches of the 1857–58 Indian Rebellion during his early 1858 campaign in through modern Uttar Pradesh, from Benares (Varanasi) in the then North-Western Provinces to Lucknow in Oudh. His health was ruined by his exertions, and he died at Ibstone House, Tetsworth, Oxfordshire, on 5 February 1862. Franks married Matilda, daughter of Richard Kay, esq., and widow of the Rev. W. Fletcher; and Rebecca Constantia Elizabeth, widow of Samuel Brewis, esq., of Langley House, Prestwich, Lancashire.

== Bibliography ==
- Franks, Thomas Harte (1858). Operations of the Juanpore Field Force and the Fourth Division: Under the Command of T. H. Franks in Its Progress from Benares to Lucknow, Jan., Feb., and Mar., 1858. London: Spottiswoode and Company.

== Sources ==
This article incorporates text from a publication now in the public domain: "Franks, Thomas Harte". Dictionary of National Biography. London: Smith, Elder & Co. 1885–1900.
