= Battle of Baddowal =

1846 engagement of the First Anglo-Sikh War

- Part of the First Anglo-Sikh War
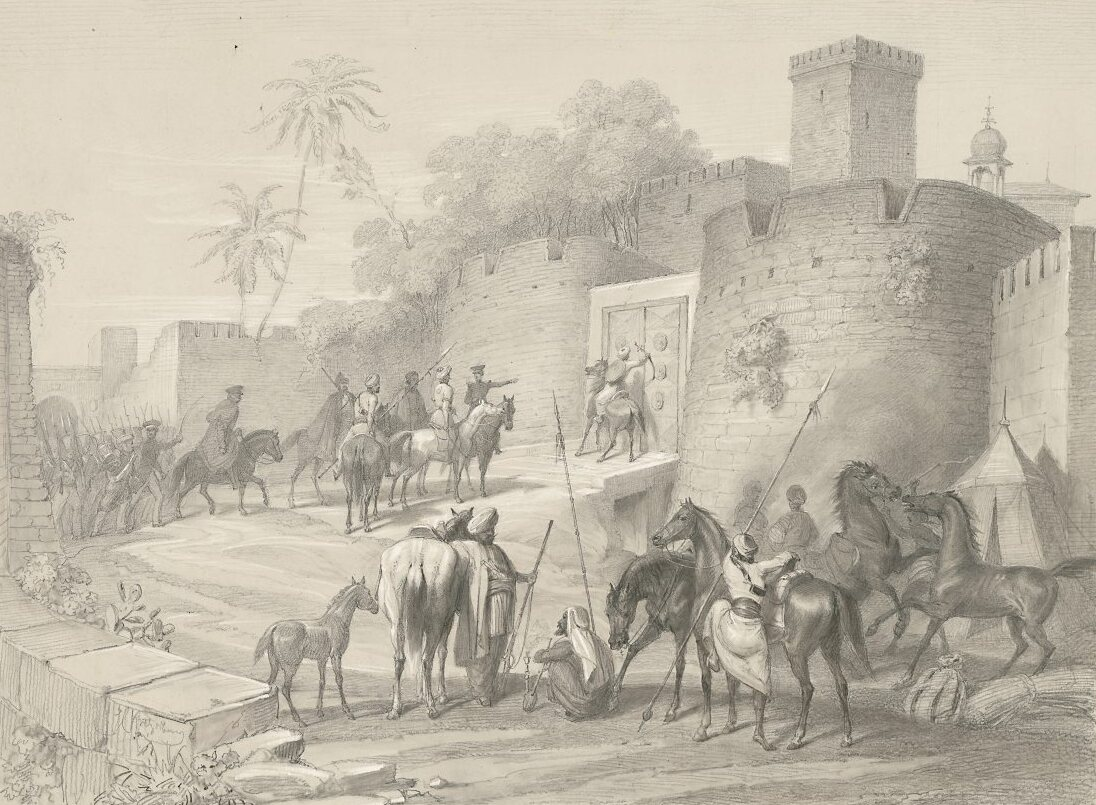
- An illustration of the British fort at Baddowal during the First Anglo-Sikh War
Date	21 January 1846
Location	Near Baddowal, Punjab
Result	See Aftermath

Belligerents
Sikh Empire	United Kingdom; East India Company

Commanders and leaders
Ranjodh Singh	Harry Smith

Strength
~10,000	~12,000

Casualties and losses
Unknown	66 killed 68 wounded 77 captured

The battle of Baddowal was an engagement between the Sikh Khalsa Army and British forces which occurred on 21 January 1846 during the First Anglo-Sikh War. After the Khalsa Army was defeated at the battles of Mudki and Ferozeshah, Ranjodh Singh Majithia led a large Sikh army to attack the British cantonment at Ludhiana. Harry Smith led a column of troops to intercept them, and both armies met at Baddowal but did not engage. Smith's column marched to Ludhiana having suffered several casualties from Sikh artillery and cavalry attacks.

== Background ==
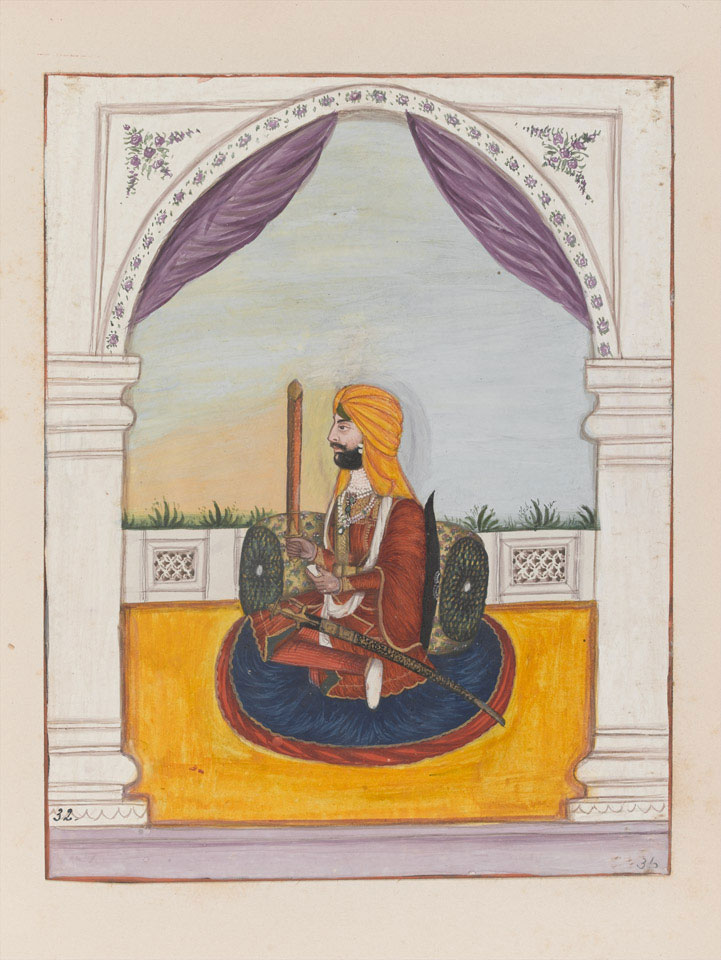
An illustration of Ranjodh Singh Majithia

On 11 December 1845, the First Anglo-Sikh War erupted between the Sikh Empire and the British, whose East India Company had seized control over large parts of the Indian subcontinent. After the Sikh Khalsa Army was defeated at the battles of Mudki and Ferozeshah, Ranjodh Singh Majithia led a Sikh army of 10,000 infantrymen, a number of cavalrymen and 60 artillery pieces (including siege guns) across the Sutlej river to cut British lines of communication.

Joined by Ajit Singh of Ladwa, Majithia's army entered Ludhiana and burnt part of the British cantonment in the city. In response, British commander Harry Smith was ordered by his superior Sir Hugh Gough to march a column of troops from Dharamkot to Ludhiana and intercept Majithia's forces. Gough also sent Smith reinforcements in the form of troops from the 16th Lancers, 3rd Bengal Light Cavalry, 50th Regiment of Foot and a troop of horse artillery.

== Battle ==
Smith left Dharamkot on 19 January with an infantry force; as he was advancing to Ludhiana, Smith's scouts reported that Majithia and his army were 20 miles west of Ludhiana. He linked up with the reinforcements sent by Gough in the same day, bringing the total strength of his army to 12,000 men. On 21 January, at around 12:30am, Smith left behind his artillery and baggage train as he felt it was slowing his army down while they were marching to Jagraon.

Leaving the artillery and baggage train to advance at their own pace under the protection of two Bengal Native Infantry companies, Smith continued his march, covering 18 miles by sunrise and being 2 miles from Baddowal. He planned to skirt Baddowal from the north to avoid encountering Sikh troops located to the south of his army. A fellow British commander, Brigadier Godby, subsequently informed Smith that Majithia's army, numbering 10,000 men, had already reached Baddowal.

Upon sighting the British column, Sikh artillery opened up a constant harassing fire on them. Smith wrote after the battle that "the enemy, with a dexterity and quickness not to be exceeded, formed a line of seven battalions directly across my rear, with guns in the intervals of battalions, for the purpose of attacking my column with his line. This was a very able and well-executed move, which rendered my position critical and demanded nerve and decision to evade the coming storm". He tried to attack the Sikh troops with the 31st Regiment of Foot, but changed his mind and ordered his army to march to Ludhiana instead.

Although the main Sikh army at Baddowal did not leave their positions to attack the British column, Sikh cavalrymen did attack the column's baggage train, looting parts of it and inflicting several casualties on Smith's troops. Despite not conclusively engaging with the Sikhs once during the march, Smith's army had suffered 66 men killed along with 68 wounded and 77 captured, mostly due to the Sikh cavalry's attack on the baggage train. Smith later attempted to justify his decision to leave behind such a small detachment of troops to guard the baggage train by claiming that Ludhiana would have been captured otherwise.

== Aftermath ==
Though Majithia's orders were to cut British lines of communication, he had failed to achieve this goal by attacking a militarily worthless target at Ludhiana and then encamping his army at Baddowal instead of further engaging British forces. If Majithia had positioned his troops across the Grand Trunk Road east of Ludhiana, he could have intercepted an advancing British supply train, though historians have speculated he refrained from doing this due to lacking a sufficient number of regular troops in his army for such a purpose.

Smith rested his troops on 22 January and made plans to attack the Sikh army at Baddowal the next day. However, he was informed on the same day that the Sikhs had moved from Baddowal to a ford on the Sutlej near Aliwal. Smith proceeded to occupy to the former Sikh position at Baddowal; on 26 January, Majithia was reinforced by several infantry and cavalry units. Two days later, the battle of Aliwal occurred, which resulted in a British victory. After several more victories, the war ended on 9 March with a Sikh defeat, though the British and Sikhs would fight again in the Second Anglo-Sikh War.
