= First Anglo-Sikh War Memorial =

War memorial located at Village Aliwal, Punjab, India

Coordinates: 30°51′46.71″N 74°48′59.89″E

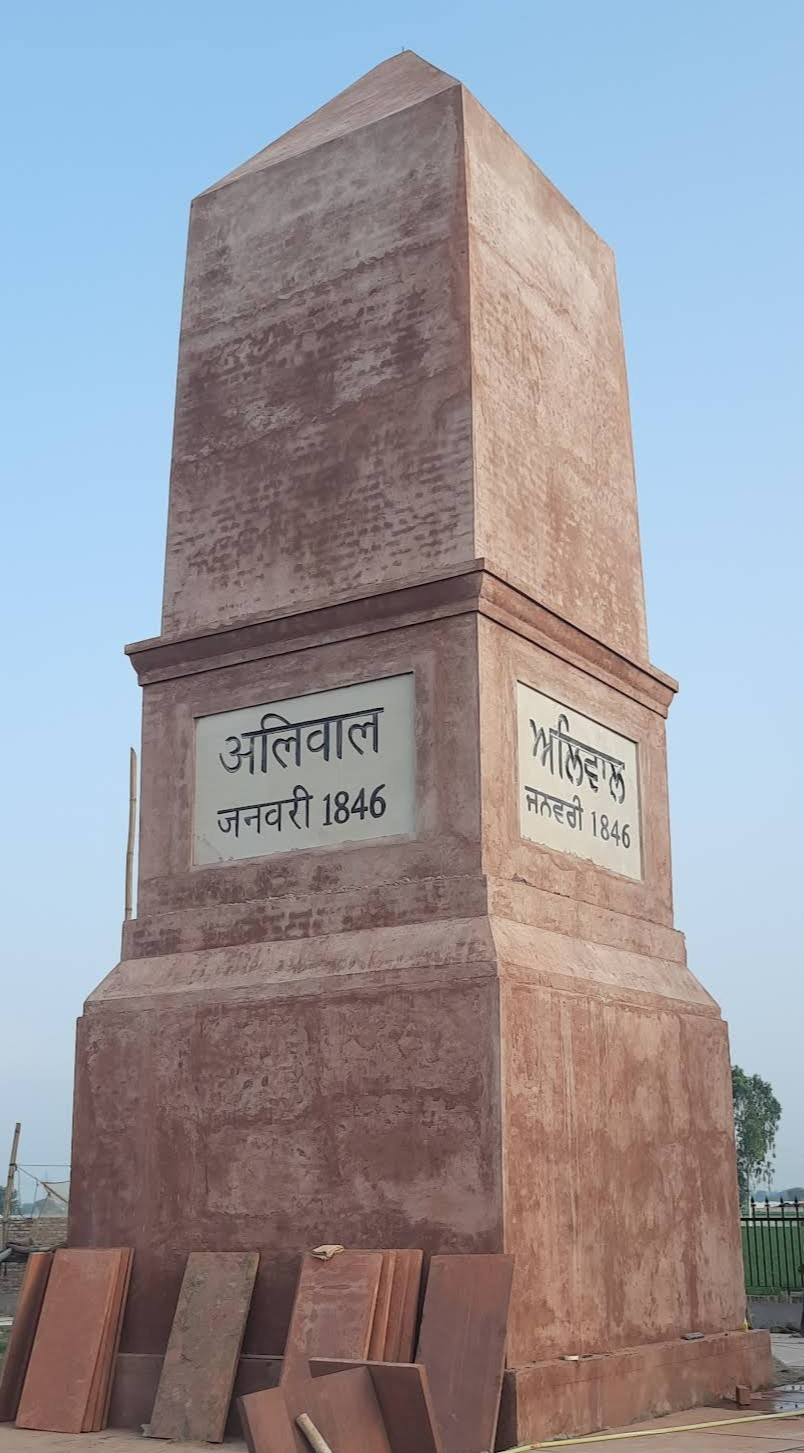
Photograph of the memorial

The First Anglo-Sikh War Memorial is located in Aliwal, Taran Taran, Punjab, India. It was built in 1853 by the British in remembrance of the First Anglo-Sikh War, to honour the bravery of the Sikh soldiers.

== History ==
The British-built memorial was declared a protected monument in 1964 under the Punjab Ancient, Historical Monuments, Archaeological Sites and Remains Act.

Renovation at a cost of 1,000,000 Rupees was completed in 2011 by the Punjab Heritage and Tourism Promotion Board. Funds ran out before completion, attracting criticism over ignoring the project. With another investment of Rs. 30 lakh, the 55-feet memorial was constructed with Chhoti Nanakshahi brick, including a library with books on history, literature, and religion, the renovation was completed in October 2015.

In the presence of Manpreet Singh Ayali, the renovated memorial was inaugurated on 6 October 2015 by Jathedar Avtar Singh Makad and the Shiromani Gurudwara Prabandhak Committee.

== First Anglo-Sikh War ==
The First Anglo-Sikh War was fought in 1845–46, which put the Punjab partially under British control. It is believed that the British prepared for the war in 1843 when Lord Ellenborough discussed the possibility of military occupation of the Punjab with the home government. British military troops in the Punjab numbered 86,023 men with 116 guns. 45,500 men armed with 98 guns were in the hill stations of Subathu and Kasauli, with 60,000 Sikh soldiers. With more than 10,000 Sikhs killed, the British won the battle and effective power went into the hands of Colonel Henry Lawrence, which also helped them to occupy Kasur. Maharani Jind Kaur continued as the regent and Raja Lal Singh as servant of Maharaja Duleep Singh.

== See also ==
- Anglo Sikh war memorial
