= Rode Jallewala =

- village
- Location in Punjab, India Rode Jallewala (India)
- Coordinates: 31.1210338°N 74.8732477°E
- Country: India
- State: Punjab
- District: Firozpur
- Tehsil: Zira
- Elevation: 205 m (673 ft)

Population (2011)
  - Total: 1,602
- Time zone: UTC+5:30 (IST)
- 2011 census code: 34303

Rode Jallewala is a village in the Firozpur district of Punjab, India. It is located in the Zira tehsil.

== Demographics ==
According to the 2011 census of India, Rode Jallewala had 298 households. The effective literacy rate (i.e. excluding children aged 6 and below) was 66.93%.

Demographics (2011 Census)
	Total	Male	Female
Population	1602	830	772
Children aged below 6 years	193	107	86
Scheduled caste	212	102	110
Scheduled tribe	0	0	0
Literates	943	514	429
Workers (all)	470	429	41
Main workers (total)	402	366	36
Main workers: Cultivators	306	288	18
Main workers: Agricultural labourers	39	35	4
Main workers: Household industry workers	3	0	3
Main workers: Other	54	43	11
Marginal workers (total)	68	63	5
Marginal workers: Cultivators	11	10	1
Marginal workers: Agricultural labourers	52	50	2
Marginal workers: Household industry workers	0	0	0
Marginal workers: Others	5	3	2
Non-workers	1132	401	731

== Battle of Sobraon ==
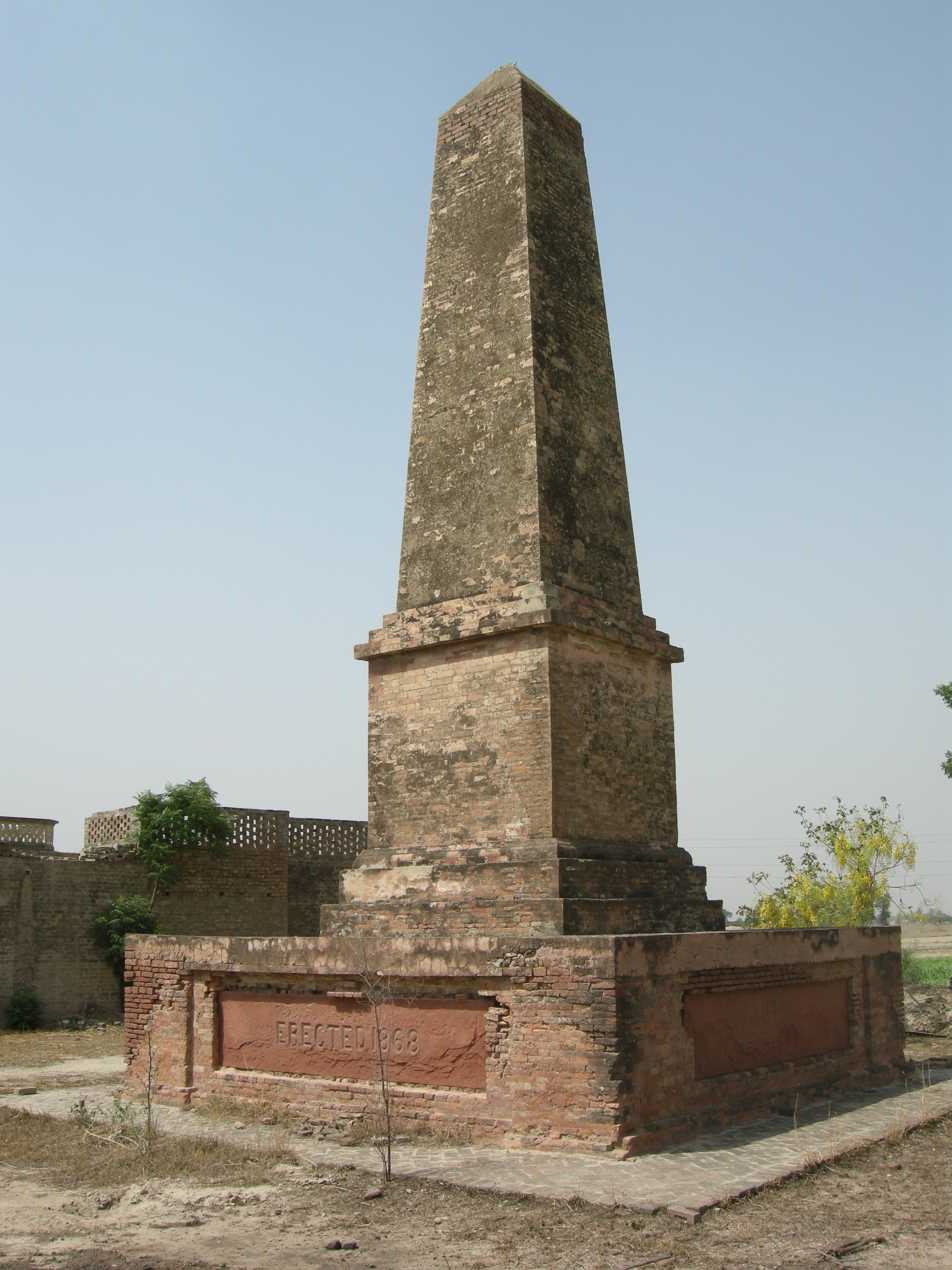
Anglo-Sikh War Memorial Sobraon

Next to the village is the site of the Battle of Sobraon in 1846. A monument was erected on the site in 1868. Photographs of the monument
