= Robert Dick (British Army officer) =

Scottish soldier (1787–1846)

Major-General Sir Robert Dick KCB KCH
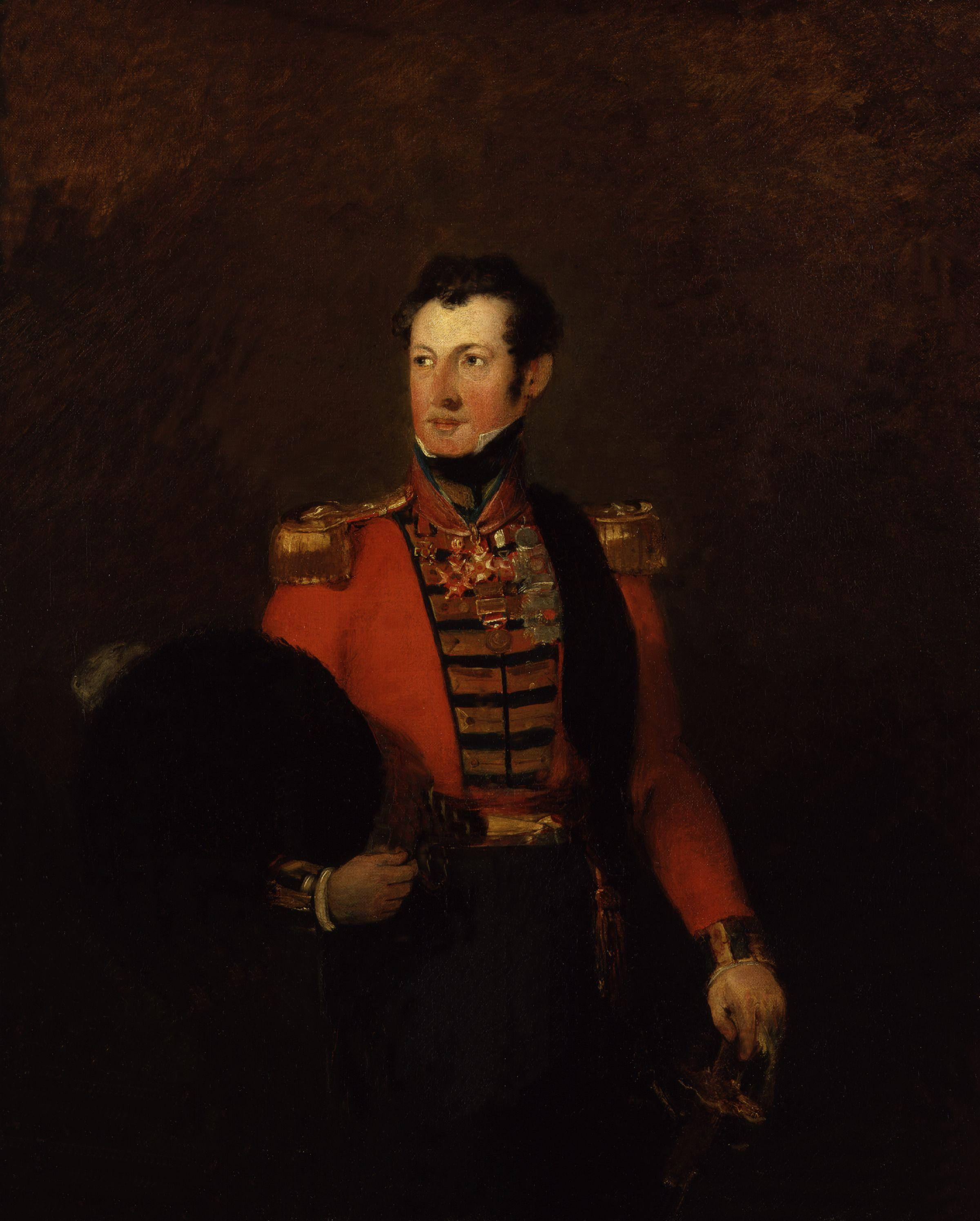
- Portrait by William Salter
- Born: 29 July 1787
- Died: 10 February 1846 (aged 58)
- Military career
- Allegiance: United Kingdom
- Branch: British Army
- Rank: Major-General
- Commands: Third Infantry Division
- Conflicts: Sikh War; Battle of Quatre Bras; Battle of Fuentes de Oñoro; Battle of Salamanca; Battle of Bussaco; Battle of Waterloo
- Awards: Knight Commander of the Order of the Bath; Knight Commander of the Royal Guelphic Order

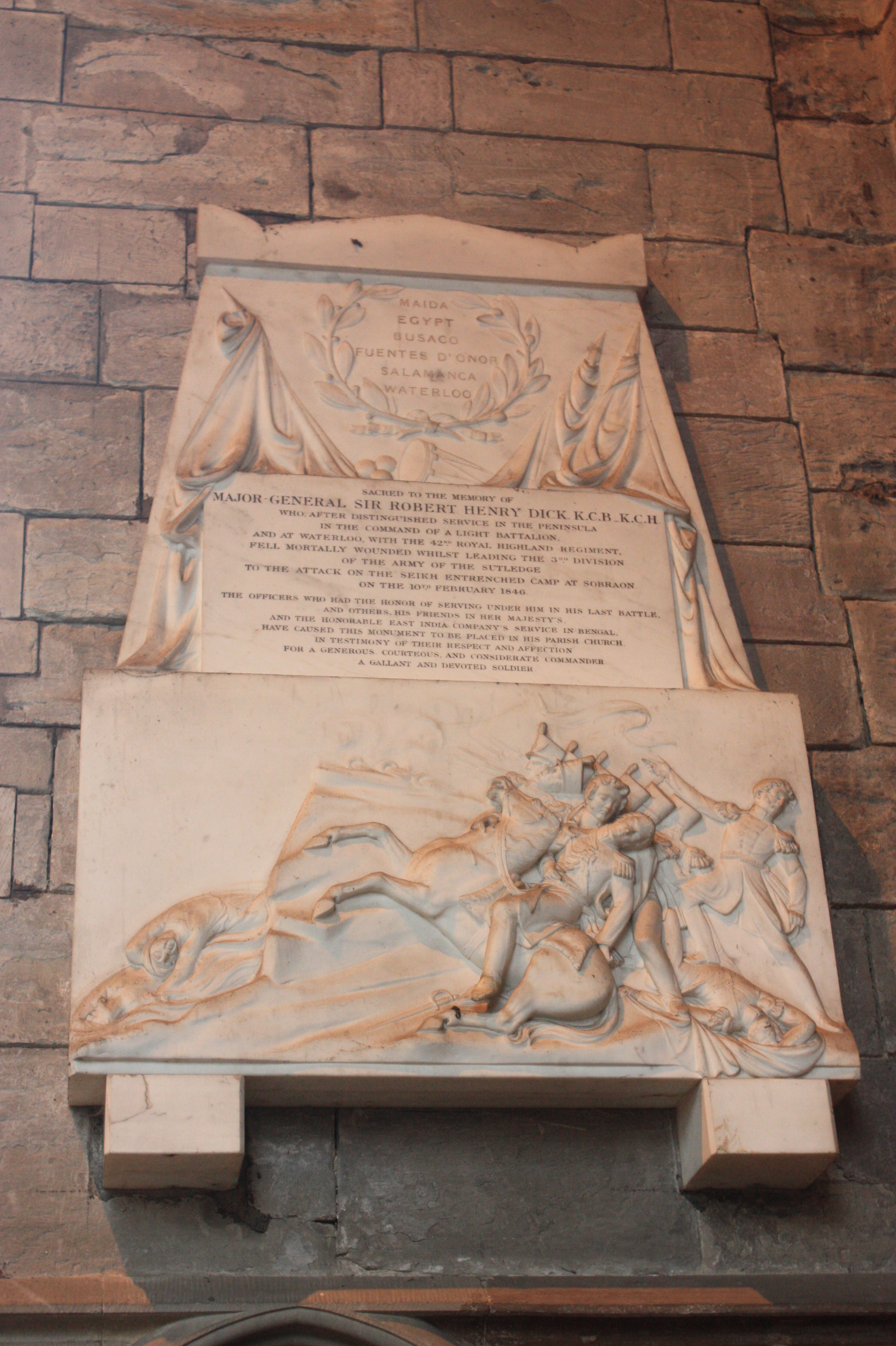
Memorial to Sir Robert Henry Dick, Dunkeld Cathedral

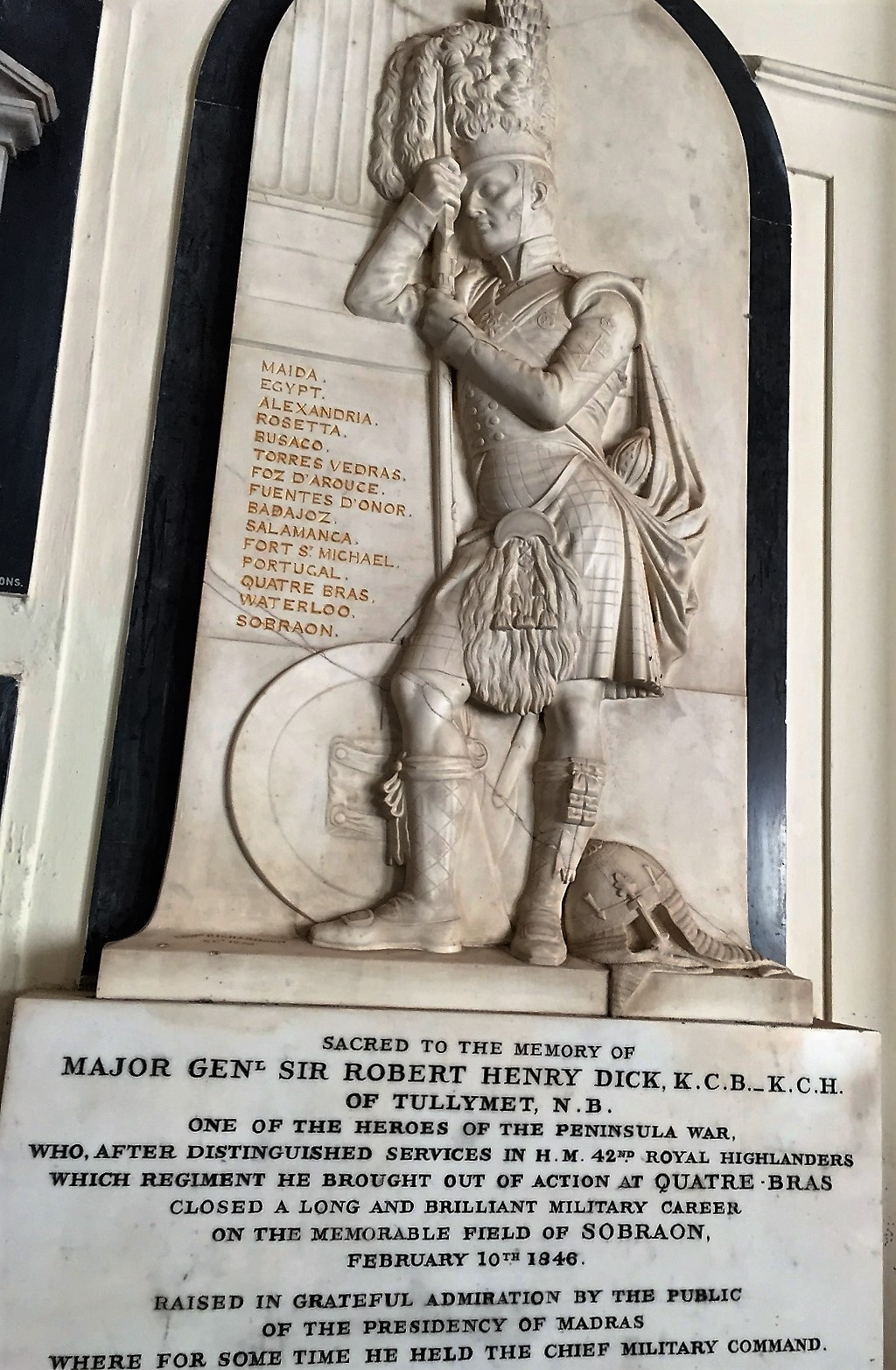
Memorial to Sir Robert Henry Dick, St. George's Cathedral, Madras

Major-General Sir Robert Henry Dick KCB KCH (29 July 1787 – 10 February 1846) was a Scottish soldier, son of a medical doctor in the East India Company's service.

== Military career ==
He entered the British Army in 1800 serving in the 75th Regiment. He was a lieutenant in the 42nd Regiment of Foot in 1804. He served as an officer in the 42nd Regiment of Foot serving in the Peninsular War. He fought at Buçaco, Fuentes de Oñoro, and Salamanca. He distinguished himself at Quatre Bras and Waterloo

In 1814, he received the C.B., followed by the K.C.H. in 1832 and the K.C.B. in 1838. In 1837, he was promoted to be major general, and in 1841–1842 was acting Commander-in-Chief at Madras. In 1846, he assumed command of the Third Infantry Division in the Sikh War. He fell, aged 58, while leading a second charge against Sikh entrenchments at Sobraon.

== Memorials ==
He is buried at Ferozepore:

Here lies in the hope of joyful resurrection Sir Robert Henry Dick of Tully Mett, Perthshire N.B. Major-General Knight Commander of the Orders of the Bath and of Hanover, Knight of the Austrian Military Order of Maria Theresa and of the Russian Order of Vladimir. Colonel of H.M. 73rd Regt. For his country he fought & bled: in Egypt at Maida thro'out the Peninsula at Waterloo & in India. For his valour and skill at Fuentes d'onor Busaco Salamanca and Waterloo he received two medals and two honorary clasps. Born on 29 July 1787 AD he fell in the moment of victory on the 10th Feby 1846 AD while cheering on H.M's 80th Regt having led his division in the assault on the entrenched camp of the Seikh at Sobraon. Honoured and beloved he lived honoured and lamented he died.

Memorial at Dunkeld Cathedral, Dunkeld, Tayside:

Sacred to the memory of Major-General Sir Robert Henry Dick KCB KCH who after distinguished service in the Peninsula in the command of a Light Battalion and at Waterloo with the 42nd Royal Highland Regiment fell mortally wounded whilst leading the 3rd Division of the Army of the Sutledge to the attack on the Seikh entrenched camp at Sobraon on 10 February 1846. The officers who had the honour of serving under him in his last battle and other friends in Her Majesty's and the Honourable East India Company's Service in Bengal have caused this monument to be placed in his parish church.

Memorial at the St. George's Cathedral, Madras, India

Sacred to the memory of Major-General Sir Robert Henry Dick, K.C.B._K.C.H. of Tullymet, N.B., one of the heroes of the Peninsula war, who, after distinguished services in H.M.'s 42nd Regiment Royal Highlanders, which regiment he brought out of action at Quatre Bras, closed a long and brilliant military career on the memorable field of Sobraon.

February 10th 1846

Raised in grateful admiration by the public of the Presidency of Madras, where, for some time, he held tho Chief Military Command.

Over the inscription is a 42nd Highlander in full uniform resting against a pedestal, on which is inscribed the battle roll of the regiment –

Maida, Egypt, Alexandria, Rosetta, Busaco, Torres Vedras, Foz D'Arouce, Fuentes de Onoro, Badagoz, Salamanca, Fort St. Michael, Portugal, Quatre Bras, Waterloo, Sobraon.

A memorial also exists in St Giles Cathedral in Edinburgh.

His portrait, by William Salter, is in the National Portrait Gallery.
