= Battle of Aliwal =

Part of the First Anglo-Sikh War (1846)

Coordinates: 30.9452°N 75.6142°E

- Part of the First Anglo-Sikh War
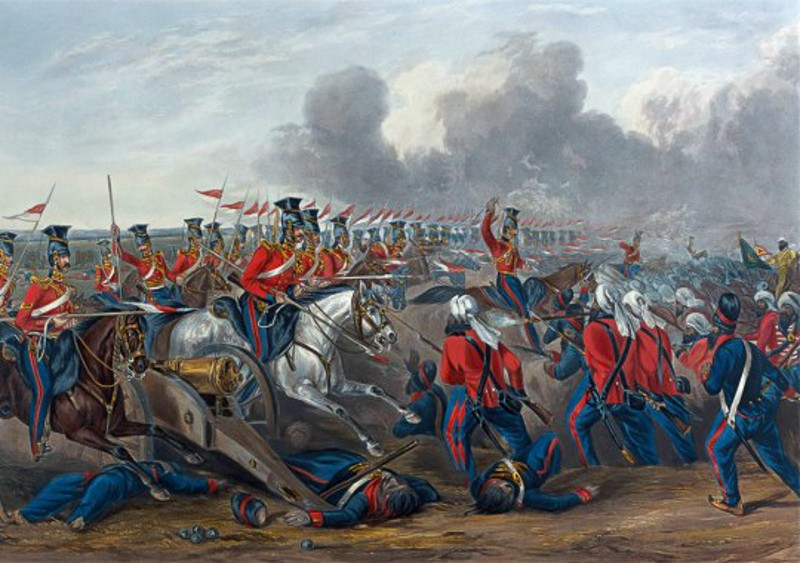
- Charge of the British 16th Lancers against Sikh Fauj-i-Ain infantry and artillery
Date	28 January 1846
Location	near the Sutlej river
Result	British victory

Belligerents
East India Company	Sikh Empire

Commanders and leaders
Sir Harry Smith	Ranjodh Singh

Strength
10,000; 28–32 guns	15,000; 69–70 guns

Casualties and losses
589-850	2,000; 67 guns

The Battle of Aliwal was fought on 28 January 1846 between the British and Sikh forces in northern India (now Punjab, India). The British were led by Sir Harry Smith, while the Sikhs were led by Ranjodh Singh Majithia. Britain's victory in the battle is sometimes regarded as the turning point in the First Anglo-Sikh War.

== Background ==
The First Anglo-Sikh War began six years after the death of Ranjit Singh, who had established the Sikh Empire in the Punjab. The Punjab became increasingly disordered, while the British increased their military forces on their border with the Punjab. Eventually, the increasingly turbulent Sikh Khalsa Army crossed the Sutlej River and invaded British territory under leaders who were distrustful of their own troops.

On 21 December and 22 December 1845, the army of the British East India Company commanded by Sir Hugh Gough and the Governor-General of Bengal, Sir Henry Hardinge, fought the bloody Battle of Ferozeshah. The Sikh armies under Vizier Lal Singh and Commander in Chief Tej Singh eventually retreated, but the British army was shaken by its heavy losses. They did not renew hostilities for some weeks, and Hardinge sought to relieve Gough of his command, blaming his tactics for the heavy casualties.

The Sikhs too were temporarily disheartened by the retreats ordered by their commanders. However, they were reinforced by troops who had not yet seen action and moved back across the Sutlej to occupy a bridgehead at Sobraon, while a detachment under Ranjodh Singh Majithia (sometimes transcribed as "Runjoor Singh"), with 7,000 men and 20 guns, crossed higher up the Sutlej to besiege the British-held fortress of Ludhiana and menace Gough's and Hardinge's supply lines. The British commanders detached a division under Sir Harry Smith to clear this threat to their rear.

== Campaign ==
On 16 January 1846, Smith recovered two outposts which the Sikhs had seized at Fategarh and Dharmkot. Although Runjodh Singh's irregular cavalry had raided over a wide area and set fire to part of the British cantonments at Ludhiana, his main body was advancing only slowly on Ludhiana.

Harry Smith first intended to attack Runjodh Singh's army at Buddowal. However, on learning of the Sikh strength, and receiving further orders from Gough, he instead force-marched his troops via Jagraon, collecting a British regiment there, to reach Ludhiana ahead of the Sikh main body. On 21 January, as he left Buddowal, the Sikh irregular cavalry (the Gorchurras) continually attacked his rearguards. They captured most of Smith's baggage animals (mules, bullocks and elephants), and cut down any straggling troops. Nevertheless, Smith succeeded in reaching Ludhiana, with his troops exhausted. A brigade of troops from Delhi, including two Gurkha battalions, reinforced him.

After resting his troops, Smith once again advanced to Buddowal. The Sikhs had withdrawn to Aliwal on the Sutlej, awaiting reinforcements. On 28 January, Smith advanced against them, cautiously at first.

== Battle ==
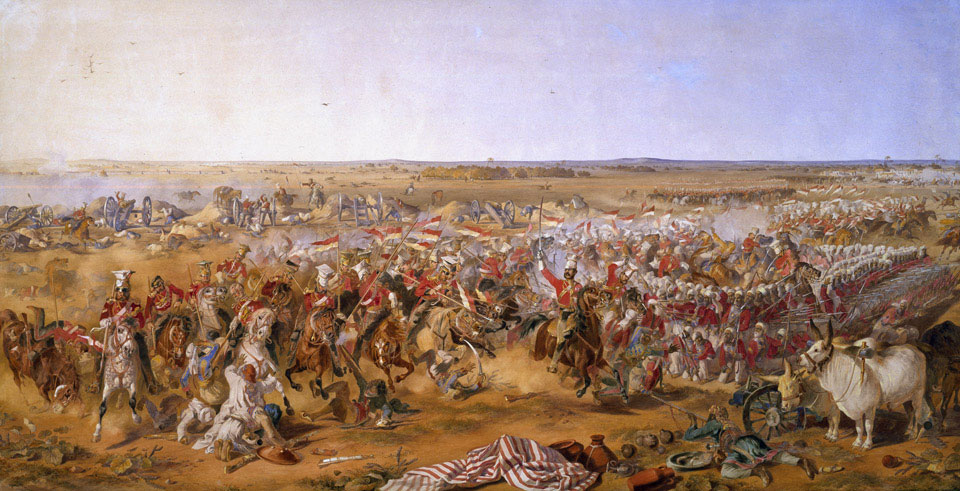
16th Lancers, Battle of Aliwal, 28 January 1846

The Sikhs had occupied a position 4 miles (6.4 km) long, which ran along a ridge between the villages of Aliwal, on the Sutlej, and Bhundri. The Sutlej ran close to their rear for the entire length of their line, making it difficult for them to manoeuvre and also potentially disastrous if they were forced to retreat. Facing them Smith had about 10,000 men and 28 guns.

After the initial artillery salvoes, Smith determined that Aliwal was the Sikh weak point. He sent two of his four infantry brigades to capture the village, from where they could enfilade the Sikh centre. They seized the village, and began pressing forwards to threaten the fords across the Sutlej.

As the Sikhs tried to swing back their left, pivoting on Bhundri, some of their cavalry presented a threat to the open British left flank. A British and Indian cavalry brigade, led by the 16th Lancers, charged and dispersed them. The 16th Lancers then attacked a large body of Sikh infantry. These were battalions organised and trained in contemporary European fashion by Neapolitan mercenary, Paolo Di Avitabile. They formed square to establish a strong front against a cavalry charge, as most European armies did. Nevertheless, the 16th Lancers broke the square. Both forces suffered heavy casualties.

The infantry in the Sikh centre tried to defend a nullah (dry stream bed), but were enfiladed and forced into the open by a Bengal infantry regiment and then cut down by fire from Smith's batteries of Bengal Horse Artillery.

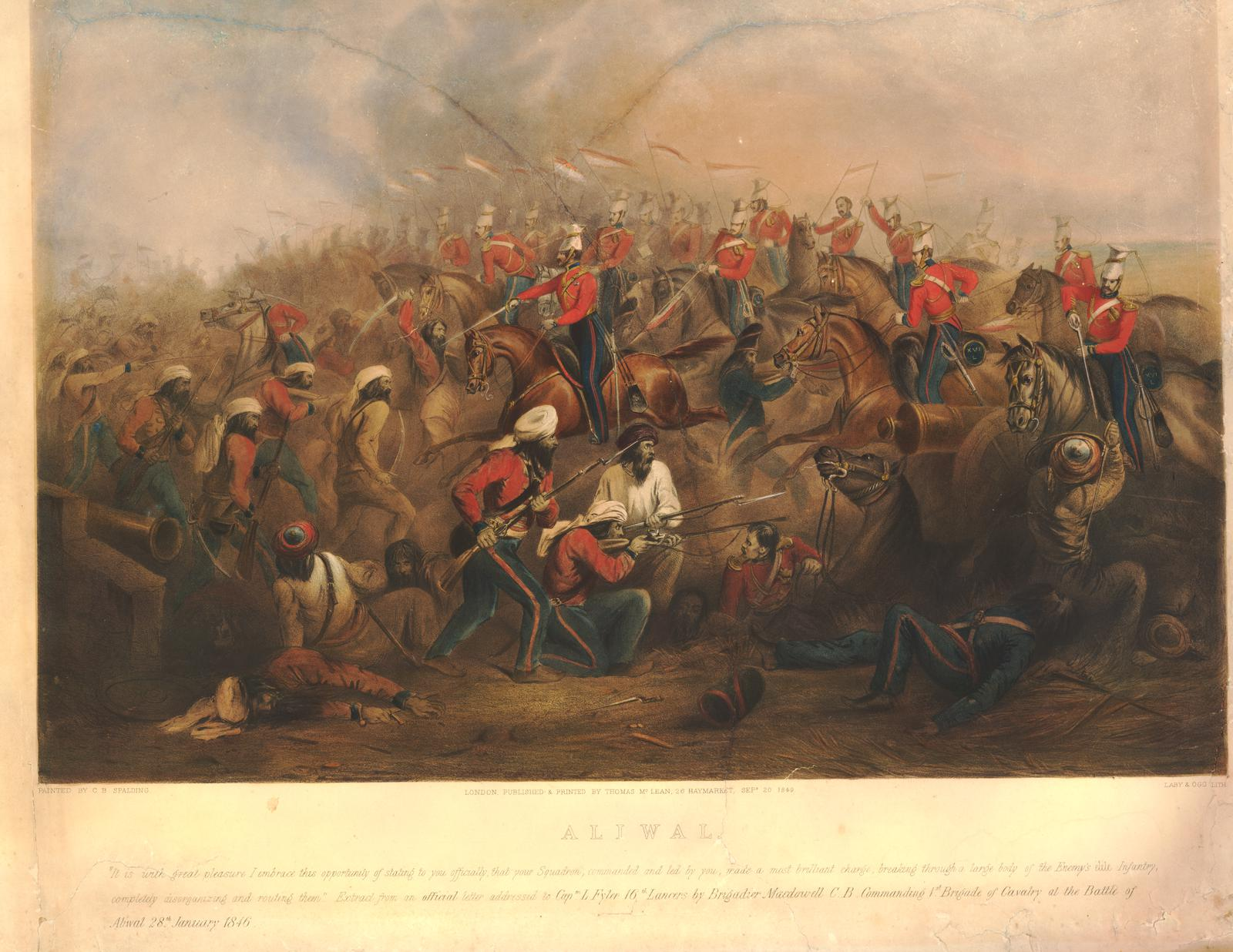
Captain Lawrence Fyler (centre) leading cavalry charge into Sikh infantry; casualties in foreground. Chromolithograph, 1849.

Unlike most of the battles of both Anglo-Sikh Wars, when the Sikhs at Aliwal began to retreat, the retreat quickly turned into a disorderly rout. When the Sikh soldiers fled across the fords, they abandoned most of their guns, either on the river bank or in the fords, along with all baggage, tents and supplies. They lost 2,000 men and 67 guns.

== Aftermath ==
Smith wrote afterwards:

I have gained one of the most glorious battles ever fought in India ... Never was victory more complete, and never was one fought under more happy circumstances, literally with the pomp of a field day; and right well did all behave.

Many commentators referred to Smith's victory as the "Battle without a mistake". Except for the 16th Lancers, who lost 144 men out of about 300, few of Smith's units had heavy casualties. Total British casualties numbered 589, of which 151 were killed.

== Order of battle ==
=== British regiments ===
- 16th The Queen's Lancers
- 31st Foot
- 50th Foot
- 53rd Foot

=== Indian regiments ===
- Governor General’s Bodyguard
- 1st Bengal Native Cavalry
- 3rd Bengal Native Cavalry
- 5th Bengal Native Cavalry
- 4th Irregular Cavalry
- Shekawati Cavalry
- 3 Batteries of Horse Artillery
- 2 Field Batteries of Artillery
- 24th Bengal Native Infantry
- 36th Bengal Native Infantry
- 47th Bengal Native Infantry
- 48th Bengal Native Infantry
- Nasiri Gurkha Battalion
- Sirmoor Gurkha Battalion
