= Aliwal, Taran Taran =

Aliwal
- village
- Location in Punjab, India Aliwal (India)
- Coordinates: 30°57′N 75°37′E
- Country: India
- State: Punjab
- District: Ludhiana

Languages
  - Official: Punjabi
- Time zone: UTC+5:30 (IST)

Aliwal is a village in India, located in the Ludhiana district of Punjab, on the Sutlej river.

It is the site of an important battle during the First Anglo-Sikh War. Late in January 1846 it was held by Ranjur Singh, who had crossed the river in force and threatened Ludhiana. On the 28th Sir Harry Smith, with a view to clearing the left or British bank, attacked him, and after a struggle pierced the Sikh troops with his cavalry, and pushed them into the river, where large numbers perished, leaving 67 guns to the victors. The consequence of the victory was the submission of the whole territory east of the Sutlej river to the British.

Before the partition of India, Ailwal had a Muslim majority.
