= Sobraon =

- Village
- Location in Punjab, India Sobraon (India)
- Coordinates: 31°11′N 74°51′E
- Country: India
- State: Punjab
- District: Tarn Taran

Languages
  - Official: Punjabi
- Time zone: UTC+5:30 (IST)

Sobraon (Punjabi pronunciation: [sə̀bɾäˑvä̃ː]) is a village in Punjab, India. It is located west to Harike village in Tarn Taran district. The Sutlej river is to the south of this village. The village is located at 31°10'39N 74°51'10E with an altitude of 192 metres (633 feet).

== History ==
It is famous for being the site of the Battle of Sobraon.
