= Fauj-i-Ain =

- فوج عین
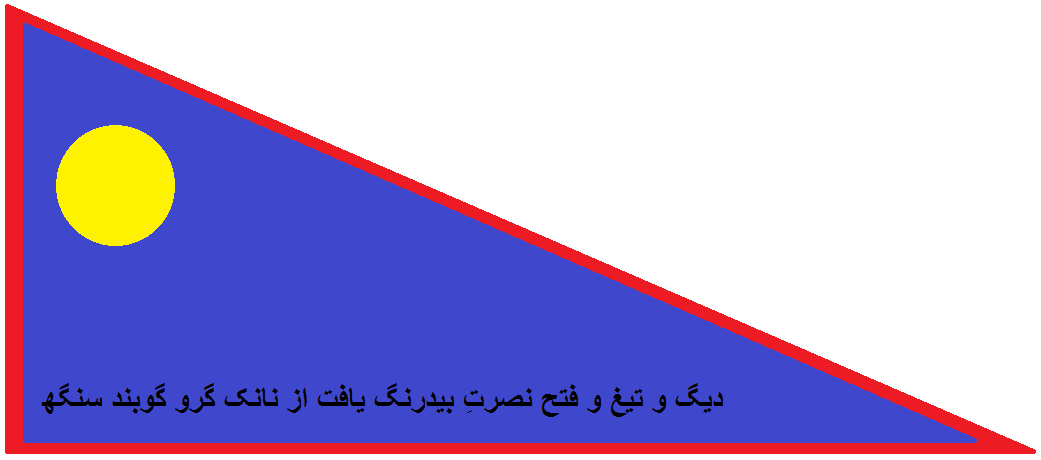
- Active: 1805–1849
- Disbanded: After the Battle of Gujrat of the Second Anglo-Sikh War due to the end of Sikh Empire
- Country: Sikh Empire
- Size: 60,000 men (45,000 Infantry, 10,000 cavalry and 5,000 artillery) (largest, during 1838-39, before the death of Maharaja Ranjit Singh of Punjab)
- Garrison/HQ: Lahore, Attock, Kangra, Multan, Peshawar, Kashmir
- Nickname: Fauj-i -Qawaidan (The army with rules)
- Motto: Deg Tegh Fateh
- Engagements: Afghan-Sikh Wars, Sino-Sikh War, Anglo-Sikh Wars

Commanders
- Notable commanders: Jarnail Sardar Hari Singh Nalwa; Maharaja Ranjit Singh of Punjab; Jean-Francois Allard; Jean-Baptiste Ventura

The Fauj-i-Ain (Punjabi: ਫੌਜ -ਏ-ਐਨ, Persian: فوج عین) was a branch of the Sikh Khalsa Army and was the regular army of Maharaja Ranjit Singh of Punjab. It contained infantry, cavalry and artillery units. The Fauj-i-Ain had two divisions, the Kampu-i-mu'alla (State Troops), and the Fauj-i-Khas (Special Force).

== Background ==
Before the reign of Maharaja Ranjit Singh the armies in Punjab, were purely cavalry. After Ranjit Singh became the Sardar of the Sukerchakia Misl, he unified the Misls through diplomacy, strategic marital alliances and conquest. Punjab under Maharaja Ranjit Singh stretched from Kashmir to the Khyber Pass. The Afghans posed a threat to the western frontier of his kingdom, the East India Company to the eastern frontier and the Gurkhas to the northeast. In 1805, he started recruiting deserters from the East India Company as officers or soldiers and commenced training a section of his army in military drill. Trained cannoneers from Pierre Cuillier-Perron's and Begum Samru's service also joined the Khalsaji.

The British where alarmed with the rapid expansion of Ranjit Singh's kingdom and sent two diplomatic missions to negotiate treaties. In 1808, a Muslim regiment accompanied Charles Metcalfe, 1st Baron Metcalfe was sent to the Sikh Empire for talks with the Maharaja. The British envoy was in Amritsar, when his soldiers took out a procession of tazias in observance of Muharram. The noise that accompanied the ritual angered the Nihangs who stood guard outside the Golden Temple. They inquired from the Company's soldiers about the disturbance they were causing during prayer. The fracas resulted in the discomfiture of the Nihangs, which impressed upon Ranjit Singh the need for training his soldiers in western tactics.

== Formation ==
Maharaja Ranjit Singh hired European officers to train and command parts of his army. It started in 1805 and continued to grow until 1839.

== Infantry ==
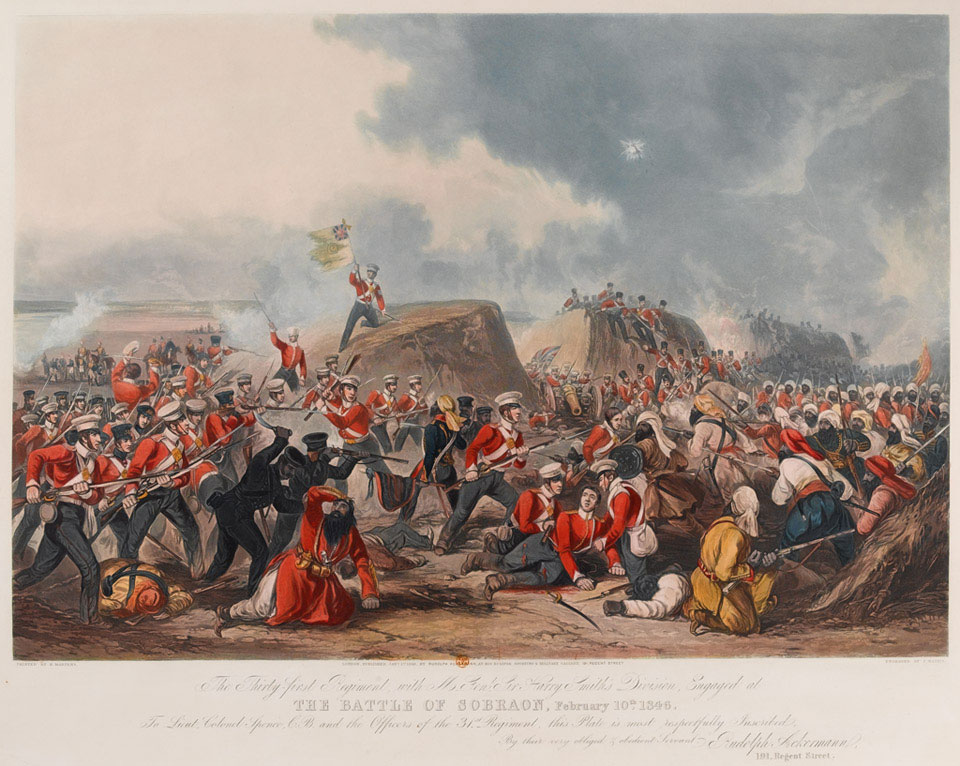
Sikh Khalsa infantry at the Battle of Sobraon

Ranjit Singh was fully aware of the importance of infantry. The task of recruitment in this army had started after 1805, which continued throughout his reign. In the beginning, the number of Sikhs in this army was nominal. The reason being that the Sikhs looked down upon infantry. Therefore, in the beginning, Ranjit Singh recruited some Pathans and Gurkhas in this section of his army. Afterwards, owing to Ranjit Singh's efforts, Sikhs too began to join it. In 1822, he employed General Jean-Baptiste Ventura to train the infantry in western pattern. Under his guidance, the infantry became the most disciplined army of within a few years.

By 1838-1839 the strength of the infantry had risen to 45,000. It was divided into battalions, companies and sections. Each battalion consisted of 800 soldiers. It was put under a Commandant. Each battalion was divided into eight companies. Each company was put under a Subedar. Each company was divided into 4 sections. Each section consisted of 25 soldiers. It was put under a Jamadar. The Fauj-i-Khas, was also part of the Fauj-i-Ain. It consisted of the elite soldiers of the Sikh Khalsa Army. It had a separate emblem and harsh training.

== Cavalry ==
The second most important part of the army was cavalry. In order to organize it on western lines, Ranjit Singh appointed General Jean-Francois Allard. Under his command, the cavalry became very strong. In 1838–39, the overall strength of the cavalry was 10,000. The cavalry was divided into regiments. Each regiment consisted of 250 to 600 cavaliers. The regiments were further divided into risalas (corps). Each Risala consisted of 150 to 250 cavaliers. The officers and other non-combatants of cavalry were similar to those of infantry. The pay of the cavalry was, however, higher than that of the infantry.

== Artillery ==
Ranjit Singh I was fully aware of the importance of artillery in the modern warfare. Therefore, he paid a special attention to the development of artillery in 1810. In 1812 he employed General Claude Auguste Court and Colonel Alexander Gardner in 1832 and organized Topkhana-i-Khas. Under their able guidance the artillery made matchless progress in a few years. Maharaja Ranjit Singh divided his artillery into four categories:

- Topkhana-i-Fili: Heavy cannons pulled by elephants
- Topkhana-i-Shutri consisted of those guns which were pulled by camels.
- Topkhana-i-Aspi consisted of light guns pulled by horses
- Topkhana-i-Gavi consisted of medium cannons pulled by oxen

The artillery was divided into batteries or deras. Each battery consisted of 10 guns and 250 gunners. Each battery was under a commandant. The batteries were further divided into sections. Each section compromised 2 guns and 8 to 10 gunners. Each section was under a Jamadar. The entire artillery was under a General. In 1838-39, the strength of the Sikh artillery was 182 heavy cannons, 20 Howitzers, and 60 light cannons. It had at least 5,000 gunners.

Napoleon transformed the army by introducing the corps and division system, a highly mobile and independent miniature army. Following his example, Maharaja Ranjit Singh made a new disposition of his regular army, forming separate brigades, some three and some four battalions strong of infantry with a small section of cavalry and artillery attached to each.
