= Kampu-i-mu'alla =

Army trained division

In 1822, after Maharaja Ranjit Singh gave employment to the European mercenaries, the Fauj-i-Ain divided unequally into the Kampu-i-mu'alla (State Troops) and the Fauj-i-Khas. Of the two, the Kampu-i-mu'alla was the larger trained division of the Sikh Khalsa Army comprising infantry, cavalry and artillery, but principally the infantry and artillery. The men enrolled in the Kampu-i-mu'alla wore uniforms and received a salary from the royal treasury.

The Kampu-i-mu'alla had a mistrikhana (workshop), toshakhanna (treasury), a magazine (ammunition storage), a bazaar (shops), a daftar (record-keeping) and abkari (liquor tax) units.

== Background ==
The Sukerchakia forces inherited by Ranjit Singh from his father and grandfather comprised predominantly irregular cavalry, well-suited to meet the contingencies presented in the north west frontier of the Indian subcontinent in the eighteenth century.

In the early years, Ranjit Singh often led his forces. The meteoric rise of the Company impressed upon the Sikh leader the importance of learning the enemy's art of warfare, and Ranjit Singh commenced training a section of his army in the art of European (British) warfare in the first decade of the nineteenth century. While the Fauj-i-Khas was trained in the Napoleonic art of war, these methods were introduced into the Kampu-i-mu'alla in 1836. Both the Kampu-i-mu'alla and the Fauj-i-Khas were stationed in Lahore, the capital city of the Sikh Empire, and marched as and when ordered by the Maharaja. Till 1836, the Kampu-i-mu'alla was led only by a Hindu or a Sikh general, while the smaller division of the Fauj-i-Ain, the Fauj-i-Khas, was commanded by Europeans.

== Formation ==
Initially, Ranjit Singh's standing army comprised principally irregular cavalry with a small section of trained cavalry and infantry. The formal divisions in the Sikh Khalsa Army emerged after 1823, the year the Sikh army faced the challenge of the Durrani Empire in the Battle of Nowshera fought in the trans-Indus region. Ranjit Singh's first-hand experience along this frontier made it clear that a single force would not be able to meet the threat posed along the two frontiers of his empire. The Maharaja displayed the Kampu-i-mu'alla and the Fauj-i-Khas before visiting foreign dignitaries. He impressed the governor-general of the East India Company with the training imparted to this section of his armed force.

== Size ==
The earliest trained cavalry in the Sikh Khalsa Army were deserters from the Company's army. By 1808, a section of mounted troops in the Sikh Khalsa Army went through a cavalry drill. Between 1819 and 1838, the strength of the trained cavalry in the Kampu-i-mu'alla saw a 5-fold rise, from 837 to 4,090. The first mention of infantry in the Sikh Khalsa Army is in 1803. In three decades beginning 1811, the enrolment of foot soldiers saw a 10-fold rise, while the strength of the artillery increased fourfold.

== Commanders ==
Dewan Mokham Chand till 1814

Lala Ram Dayal, grandson of Dewan Mokham Chand, till 1820

Misr Diwan Chand till 1825

Misr Sukh Dayal, brother of Misr Diwan Chand, till 1824

Tej Singh, 1834 to 1836

Three years before his demise, in 1836, Maharaja Ranjit Singh gave the joint command of the Kampu-i-mu'alla to Tej Singh and Jean-Baptiste Ventura.
