= Fauj-i-Khas =

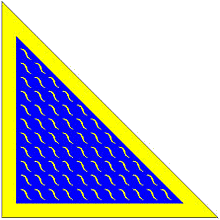
- Fauj-i-Khas infantry regimental standard
- Active: 1822–1849
- Disbanded: After the Battle of Gujrat of the Second Anglo-Sikh War due to the end of Sikh Empire
- Country: Sikh Empire
- Size: 5,500 (Total)
- Garrison/HQ: Lahore, Attock, Kangra, Multan, Peshawar
- Nicknames: Campu-i-Mualla (The Maharaja's own legion); Campu Fransez (French Legion)
- Motto: Deg Tegh Fateh
- Engagements: Afghan-Sikh Wars, Sino-Sikh War, Anglo-Sikh Wars

Commanders
- Notable commanders: Hari Singh Nalwa; Maharaja Ranjit Singh of Punjab; Gurmukh Singh Lamba; Lehna Singh Majithia; Dal Singh Nahama; Ilahi Bakhsh; Jean-Francois Allard; Jean-Baptiste Ventura

The Fauj-i-Khas was a brigade of the Fauj-i-Ain section of the Sikh Khalsa Army of Punjab. It consisted of very experienced elites and had separate flag and emblem. It was strictly disciplined on French pattern. All the equipment and weapons were of the best type. It grew to be the best organised section of the regular army (Fauj-i-Ain)

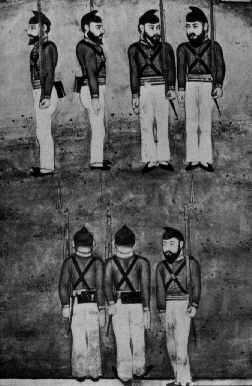
Fauj-i-Khas soldiers drilling

== Background ==
Before the reign of Maharaja Ranjit Singh the armies in Punjab were consisting purely of cavalry. As Ranjit Singh became the Sardar of Sukerchakia Misl he tried to unify with his conquests most of the Punjab. With clever diplomacy and many battles he gradually unified most of Punjab under him. However the Afghans, The British and the Gurkhas were still a very big threat, while his empire was still in its infancy. Therefore, in 1805, he started recruiting regular forces and employing East India Company deserters as officers or soldiers. This didn't go very well as most of these deserters were constantly in touch with the British. The British where alarmed with the rapid conquests of Ranjit Singh and sent many diplomatic missions to help the Phulkian sardars from a possible conquest of their lands and check the growing power of the Sikh Sovereign.

A Muslim regiment under Charles Metcalfe, 1st Baron Metcalfe was sent to Amritsar for talks with the Maharaja. The soldiers created noise through their chants as they approached Ranjit Singh’s fort in Amritsar and passed near the Golden Temple and caused an irregular detachment of Nihang guards to inquire about the disturbances during prayer, before they were challenged by the Muslim soldiers who fired upon them. The Sikh Nihangs shot off many Musket and matchlock volleys rather than a sword charge. It resulted in the death of many of Metcalfe's escorts, while others were wounded. This impressed Ranjit Singh and left a deep impact on him, as the Nihangs had quickly adopted the line formations of Metcalfe's escorts and then shot off their volleys. The Maharaja then accepted The Treaty of Amritsar (1809), and saw the British as allies for the moment as he took the British refusal to engage after the assault on Metcalfe's convoy as well as the Sikh army's frequent unanswered incursions and attacks south of the Sutlej on British army officers in Ludhiana as signs of weakness on the British's part.

== Formation ==
It was the Maharaja Ranjit Singh who started to hire European officers to train and command parts of his army. The Fauj-i-Khas was a model brigade trained and equipped after European model under the command of General Jean-Baptiste Ventura. It consisted of 11,000 horsemen (Ghor Charras), divided into 15 Dera led by eminent sardars, among them being Sham Singh Atariwala, Gurmukh Singh Lamba, Hari Singh Nalwa, and two by non Sikhs, those being the Mulraj Derah of Dewan Mulraj and Dorgra Derah of Dhian Dogra. Izazi-i-sardari was the highest honour, most distinguished Sikh generals, sardar Gurmukh Singh Lamba, Hari Singh Nalwa, and Dal Singh Nahama were recipients.

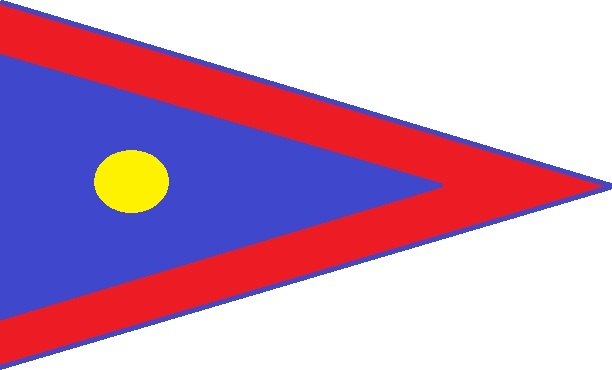
Khalsa Army Flag

== Emblems ==
The Fauj-i-Khas had its own Flag, with the Punjabi inscription of the motto of the Sikh Khalsa Army:"Deg Tegh Fateh. It also had many banners, all of them blue in colour with circles, horses, flowers and corn plants.

== Size ==
The Fauj-i-Khas had 4 battalions of infantry, 2 regiments of cavalry and a troop of artillery. The cavalry was built on a British model and the infantry on French pattern. This was the first unit in the army to be equipped European-style. Impressed by its performance, the Maharaja ordered a total reorganisation of his whole regular force on the model of Fauj-i-Khas in 1835. This alarmed the British, who had come to see the emerging military power of Punjab as a threat, to such a degree that they in 1837 issued orders to be vigilant and try to arrest any French officer travelling in disguise to join Ranjit Singh’s army.

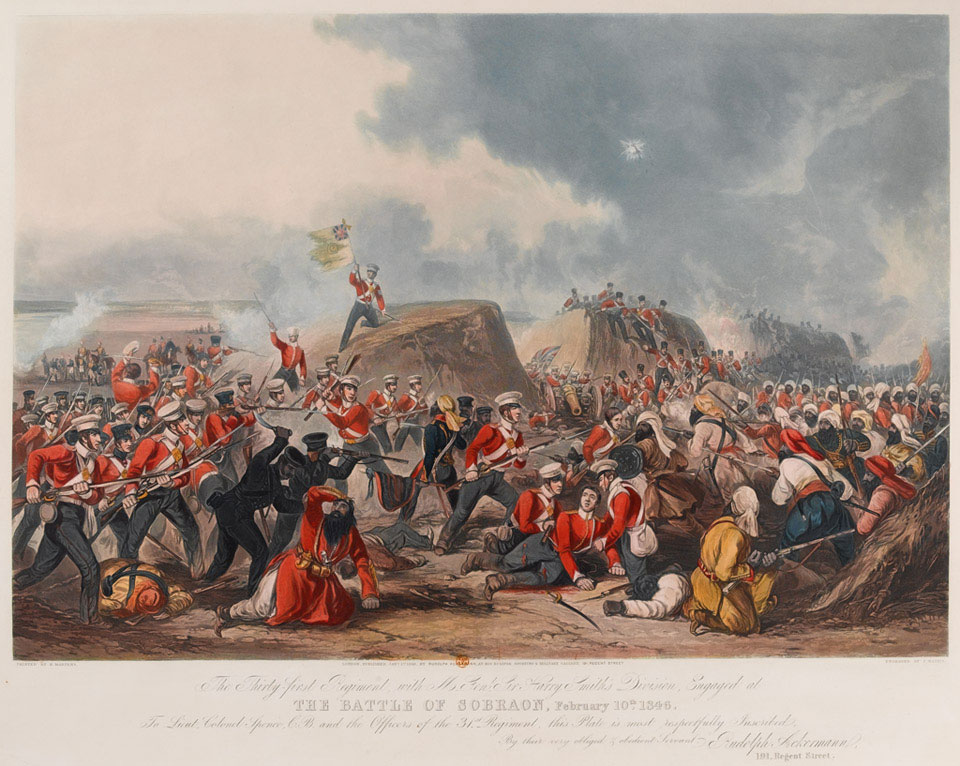
Sikh Khalsa infantry at the Battle of Sobraon

Before Ranjit Singh, the Punjab army was mainly a pure cavalry army. Under the supervision of the European officers, and encouragement by the Maharaja, the infantry and artillery gained importance, and by the time of the death of Ranjit Singh, the infantry service had become the preferred service in the army.

One of the most unique regiments of the Sikh Khalsa Army was the Shutersvaar or the cannon mounted war camel used by Hari Singh Nalwa in his conquest of Peshawar. The Shutersvaar was in the Sher-Dil-Rajman Regiment.

== Commanders ==
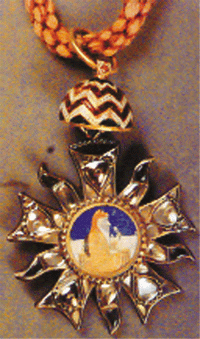
Order of Merit with a portrait of Ranjit Singh, introduced by Ranjit Singh, the first Sikh maharaja of the Panjab (1801–1839), inspired by the French Legion d’honneur and worn by foreign military commanders it was awarded to

Over the years many Europeans served in the army of the Punjab. Among them are the following who mentioned by Alexander Gardner's memoir Soldier and Traveller:

| Rank | Name | Nationality | Branch |
|---|---|---|---|
| Jarnail/Kumedan | Alexander Gardner | American | Artillery |
| | Jean-Baptiste Ventura | Italian (Jewish) | Infantry |
| | Jean-François Allard | French | Cavalry |
| | Paolo Avitabile | Italian (Neapolitan) | Infantry |
| | Claude August Court | French | Artillery |
| | Kanwar Balbhandra Rana | Nepali | Infantry |
| | Fakir Azizudin | Uzbek | |
| Sardar | Matabar Singh | Nepali | Artillery |
| | Josiah Harlan | American | Infantry |
| | Henry Charles van Cortlandt | English | |
| Adjudan-Kumedan | Matthew William Ford | English | |
| | R. Foulkes | English | |
| | Benoit Argoud | French | Infantry |
| | Francis John Canora | Irish | Artillery |
| Kalnal | Jacob Thomas | Anglo-Indian/Irish | Infantry |
| | Hohenzollern | German | |
| | Rattray (alias Leslie) | English | |
| | François Henri Mouton | French | Cavalry |
| | Mevius | German | |
| Kalnal-i-Sahni | Henry Steinbach | German | Infantry |
| | Auguste de la Font | French | |
| | M'Pherson | English | |
| | William Campbell | Anglo-Indian/Scottish | |
| | Garron or Carron | French | Cavalry |
| Jamadar Kalnal | Gordon | Anglo-Indian | |
| | de Fasheye (father) | French | |
| | de Fasheye (son) | French | |
| | Alvarine | Italian or Irish | Infantry |
| | Oms | Spanish | |
| | Vieskenawitch | Georgian | Infantry |
| | Hest | Greek | |
| Mahzor-i-Sahni | Fox | Scottish | |
| | Henri Francois Stanislaus de la Roche | French/Franco-Mauritian | |
| | Robert Walter Dubuignon de Talbot | French | |
| | John Holmes | Anglo-Indian | Infantry |
| | Vochus | Russian | |
| Mahzor | Facieu | French | |
| | John Wolff | Armenian | |
| | de l'Ust | French | |
| | Hureleek | Greek | |
| | Dubignon | French | |
| Kaptan | John Fitzroy | English | |
| | Barlow | English | |
| | Vochen | Polish | |
| | Hommus | Spanish | |
| | Martindale | Anglo-Indian | |
| | Jervais | French | |
| | Mœvuis | Russian | |
| Subedar | Bianchi | Italian | |
| | Dottenweiss | German | |
| Other | Hurbon | Spanish | Engineer |
| | Harvey | English | Medical |
| | Benét | French | Medical |
| | Johann Martin Honigberger | German (Transylvanian Saxon) | Medical |

== Sources ==
- Major Pearse, Hugh; Ranjit Singh and his white officers. In Gardner, Alexander (1999) [1898]. The Fall of Sikh Empire. Delhi, India: National Book Shop. ISBN 81-7116-231-2.
- Fauj-i-khas Maharaja Ranjit Singh and His French Officers, by Jean Marie Lafont. Published by Guru Nanak Dev University, 2002. ISBN 81-7770-048-0.
- The Sikh Army 1799-1849 By Ian Heath, Michael Perry
- Maharaja Ranjit Singh By Jean Marie Lafont (Page 59,146,148)
