= Sikh war =

Sikh war may refer to:

- Afghan–Sikh Wars (1748–1839)
- Nepal–Sikh war (1809)
- Dogra–Tibetan war (1841–1842)
- Anglo-Sikh War (disambiguation)
  - First Anglo-Sikh War (1845–1846)
  - Second Anglo-Sikh War (1848–1849)
