= Paolo Avitabile =

Italian soldier

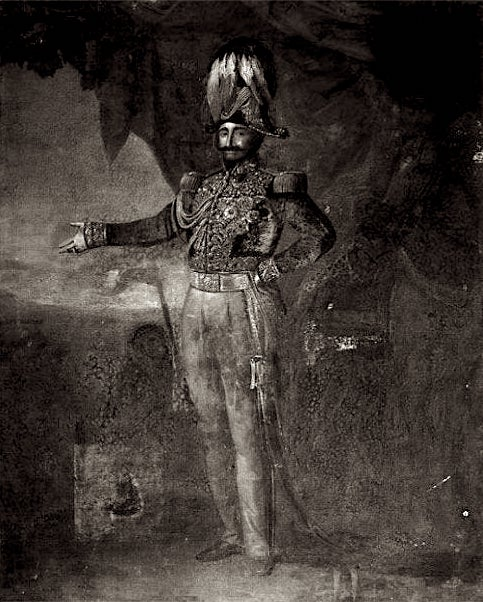
- Painting of General Paolo Avitabile, by Carlo de Falco, oil on canvas, National Museum of San Martino, Naples

Personal details
- Born: Paolo Crescenzo Martino Avitabile; 25 October 1791 Agerola, Kingdom of Naples
- Died: 28 March 1850 (aged 58) Agerola, Kingdom of the Two Sicilies
- Spouse: Enrichetta Coccia
- Awards: Légion d'Honneur; Nishan-i-Shir u Khurshid; Ordine di San Ferdinando e del merito Nishan-i-Daulat-i-Durrani; Kaukab-i-Iqbal-i-Punjab
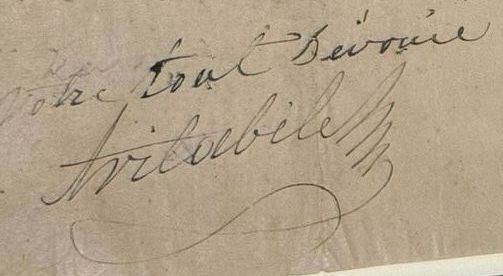
- Signature

Military service
- Allegiance: Kingdom of Naples; First French Empire; Kingdom of the Two Sicilies; Qajar Iran; Sikh Empire
- Unit: Fauj-i-Khas

Paolo Crescenzo Martino Avitabile (25 October 1791 – 28 March 1850), also known as Abu Tabela (Hindko: ابوتبیلا), was a Neapolitan-Italian soldier, mercenary and adventurer. (Note: His Indianized/localized nickname Abu Tabela was given to him by locals of the frontier-region of the Sikh Empire.) A peasant's son born in Agerola, in the province of Napoli near Sorrento (in southern Italy), he served in the Neapolitan militia during the Napoleonic wars. After Waterloo he drifted east like many other adventurous soldiers. In 1820 he joined the army of the Shah of Persia, attaining the rank of colonel and receiving several decorations before returning to Italy in 1824.

He was one of the prominent foreign officials of the Sikh Empire. He joined the army of Maharaja Ranjit Singh of the Punjab in 1827, and later also received various civilian appointments. In 1829 he was made administrator of Wazirabad and in 1837 he succeeded Hari Singh Nalwa as governor of Peshawar. He remained in the Punjab until the assassination of Maharaja Sher Singh in 1843, after which he retired to Italy, where his rank as a general was confirmed and he was knighted.

== Early life ==
Avitabile was born in the town of Agerola located in the parish of Acampora on 21 October 1791 and was the son of farmers Bartolomeo Avitabile and Angela di Fortunato. He was born into a large family of eight children, being the sixth born. At the age of 16, Avitabile enlisted into the service of the local provincial military.

== Career in Europe ==
The young Avitabile served in the local levies of the Kingdom of Naples between 1807 and 1809, when he joined the artillery of the regular army. On 29 April 1810, he was transferred to the Royal Corps of Artillery after becoming a regular soldier. As a part of the Imperial Army, Avitabile served under Murat on several campaigns. In these campaigns he earned the rank of Lieutenant, as well as the command of the 15th Battery. After the fall of Napoleon and the defeat of Murat at Tolentino, Naples was restored to Ferdinand I of Sicily. Avitabile retained his rank and command and joined the army of the new Kingdom of Two Sicilies, where he joined the siege of Gaeta under the command of the Austrian general Delaver. He served under the Austrian commander Baron Joseph Lauer at the siege.

During this siege, he displayed great bravery and was wounded twice. The general recommended him for a promotion and a decoration, but was not heard. Avitabile was transferred instead to a position of lieutenant in a regiment of light infantry. It is said he quit in disgust over this treatment. His European career had come to an end in 1817, when resigned from his position.

== In Persia ==
Having quit the army in Naples, Avitabile set his eyes on a career abroad. His initial idea was to, as many of his countrymen, seek fortune in America but this ended in a shipwreck off Marseille after travelling to the Balkans and Mediterranean. While Avitabile was stranded and in-quarantine in Marseilles following the shipwreck, he was in the company of other former Napoleonic officers, one of which, Captain Beraud, advised Avitabile to seek employment in the east in the court of Qajar Persia, who were amicable to employing Europeans with military-backgrounds. Avitabile at this point believed the situation in Europe was unstable and was drawn by the prospects the east presented at the time. Avitabile left for Constantinople, arriving in 1818.

In Constantinople he was approached by an agent of the Persian Shah Fath Ali Shah recruiting European officers; in 1820, Avitabile took service with the Persian Shah. He remained in this employment for six years, during which period he rose to the rank of khan and a grade of colonel in the Persian army. Here he also met Claude August Court who would later accompany him on the travel to Punjab. He had also met with Allard and Ventura while in Persia. Avitabile and Claud reformed the Persian military along European lines, with Avitabile gaining a reputation amongst his Persian troops for being ruthless and fear-worthy. In 1826, Avitabile felt nostalgic about his homeland and therefore secured leave to return to Italy, where the sovereign of Naples presented him a gift of a box containing a Persian shawl made out of high-quality, fine cloth. However, he only remained in Naples for a short-time and became disgruntled again, returning back to Persia ultimately.

Avitabile was rewarded for his services by two of Persia's highest decorations as Grand Commander of The Lion and Sun and of The Two Lions and Crown, accompanied by official diplomas, but found the pay lacking. When he heard favourable notice from Jean-Baptiste Ventura of his employment in Punjab, Ventura again broke up to travel further to the east.

== In India ==
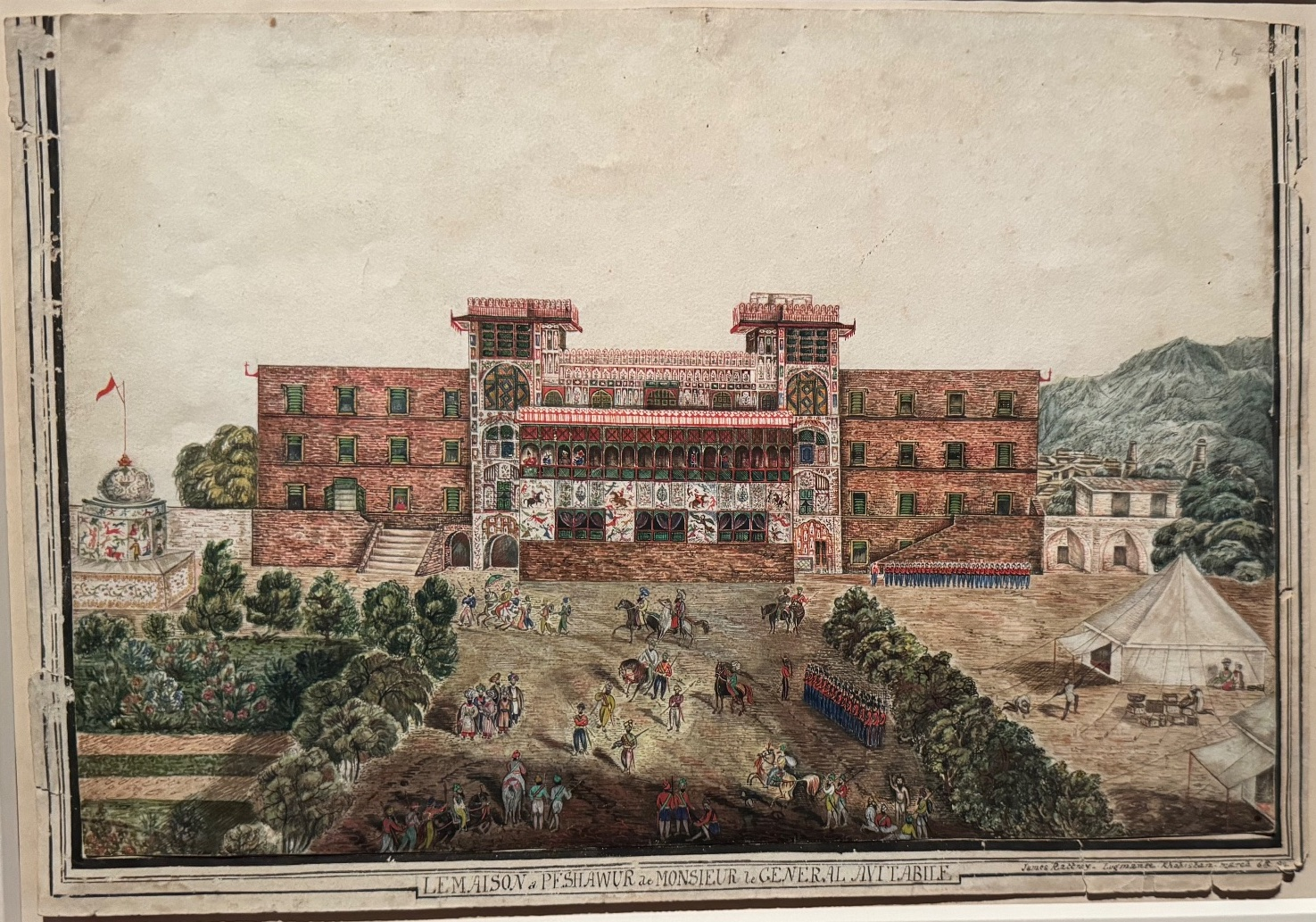
Painting of General Paolo Crescenzo Martino Avitabile's Peshawar residence, by Lieutenant James Rattray, 1840

Together with Court, Avitabile arrived in Lahore in 1827 and was hired by Maharaja Ranjit Singh. He was given a position with the artillery and put in charge of the arsenal and gun foundries. He was also given a civilian position as governor of Wazirabad. It would seem he was an able administrator, as he held the position for the next seven years and as a result, Wazirabad prospered.

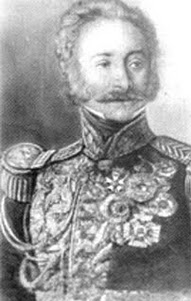
Image of "Abu Tabela", famous nickname of Paolo Avitabile in Afghanistan

In 1834 he was appointed governor of Peshawar, an area the Maharaja had conquered from the Afghans the previous year.

Whereas his rule of Wazirabad is described as just and rigorous, his governorship of Peshawar is depicted as a rule of "gallows and gibbets". Avitabile boasted:

"When I marched into Peshawar, I sent on in advance a number of wooden posts which my men erected around the walls of the city. The men scoffed at them and laughed at the madness of the feringhee [a disparaging local language term for Westerners], and harder still when my men came in and laid coils of rope at the foot of the posts...However, when my preparations were completed and they found one fine morning dangling from these posts, fifty of the worse characters in Peshawar, they thought different. And I repeated the exhibition every day till I had made a scarcity of brigands and murderers. Then I had to deal with the liars and tale bearers. My method with them was to cut out their tongues. When a surgeon appeared and professed to be able to restore their speech, I sent for him and cut out his tongue also. After that there was peace".

With a ruthless, at times brutal, style of government, Avitabile established order in the province where he became known as Abu Tabela. Summary executions became usual, and it is said that he would have people executed by throwing them from the top of Mahabat Khan Mosque. The American adventurer Alexander Gardner wrote about Avitabile's rule in Peshawar: "Under his rule small pains are taken to distinguish between innocence and guilt, and many a man, ignorant of the alleged crime, pays for it with his life". While this brutality was shocking to visiting Europeans (in the words of Sir Henry Lawrence: he acts like a savage among savage men, instead of showing them that a Christian can wield the iron sceptre without staining it by needless cruelty), it proved both successful in maintaining order and even popular among the peaceful inhabitants.

His iron-fist rule over Peshawar has made a place for him in local folklore. Even today unruly children in the city are brought to control by invoking Abu Tabela's name. In times of unrest, law-abiding citizens send a small wish for the return of an Abu Tabela to finally re-impose law and order.

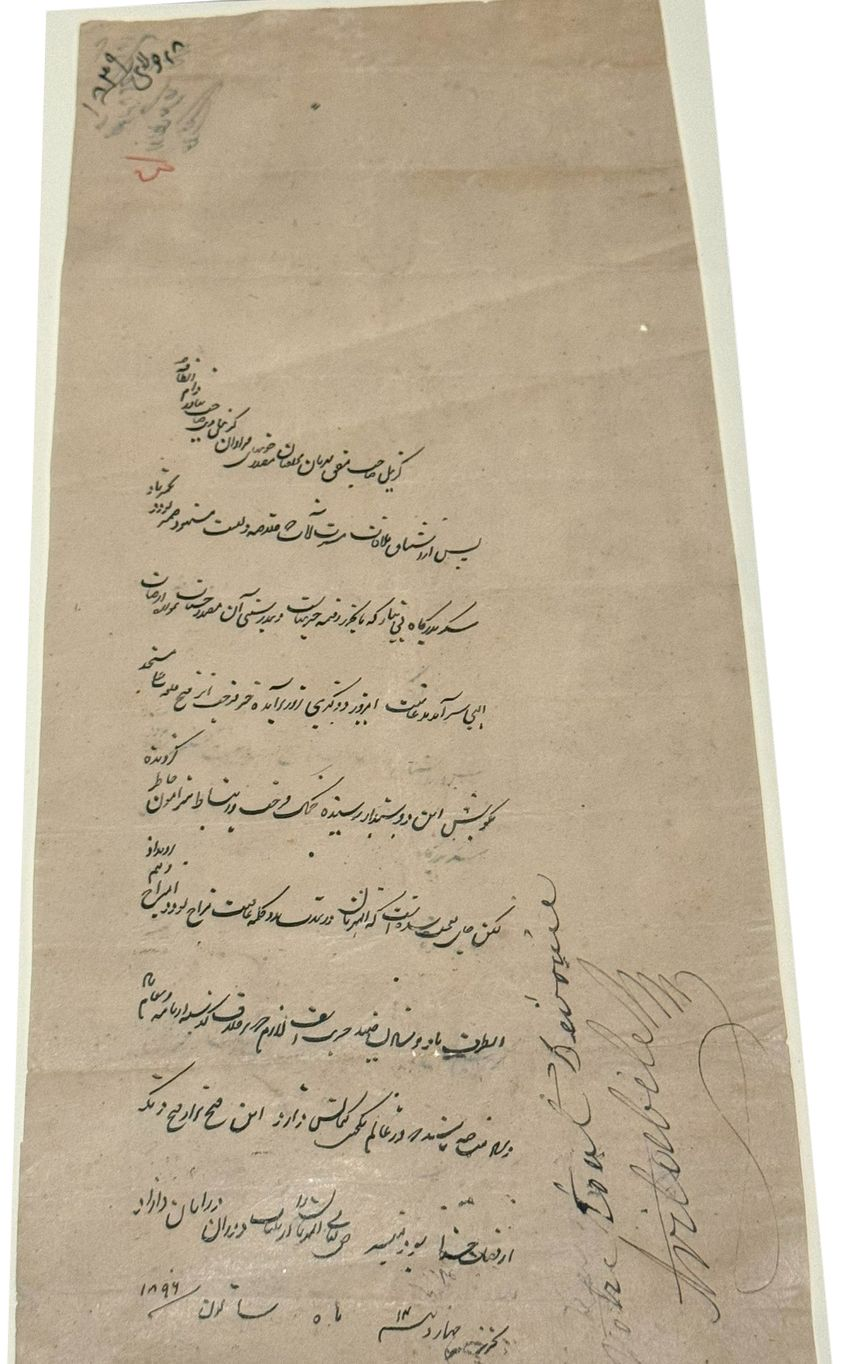
Letter written in Persian signed by Paolo Avitabile, addressed to Colonel Claude Wade, congratulating him on the conquest of Ali Masjid Fort, dated to 27 July 1839

The control of this strategic position brought him in contact with the British army during the First Anglo-Afghan War (1839–42), where he was able to render vital assistance. As governor of Peshawar, Avitabile controlled the southern entrance to the Khyber Pass, although the Maharaja did not allow for the British to move through the Sikh Empire to reach the Khyber pass, he ordered Avitabile to assist the British through the pass itself, into Afghanistan. During Elphinstone's advance in 1839, the British were well received in Peshawar and their officers received a princely treatment. Captain Havelock spent a month in Peshawar, and describes the splendour of Avitabile's court in his memoirs. He also gives a favourable characterisation of the governor: "He is, moreover, a frank, gay, and good-humoured person, as well as an excellent and skilful officer."

Avitabile was also a scholar and an engineer, who worked very closely with Lehna Singh Majithia, a great Sikh engineer of his time.

When the British returned in 1842, to avenge the defeat of Elphinstone, they were given every possible assistance by Avitabile's government, while he was still in the employ of the Sikh Empire as the Afghans had been a longtime enemy of the Sikhs.

Avitabile remained in the position of Governor during the First Anglo-Afghan War until he left in 1843. Having secured his retirement in Europe, he resigned his position to return home.

== Back home ==
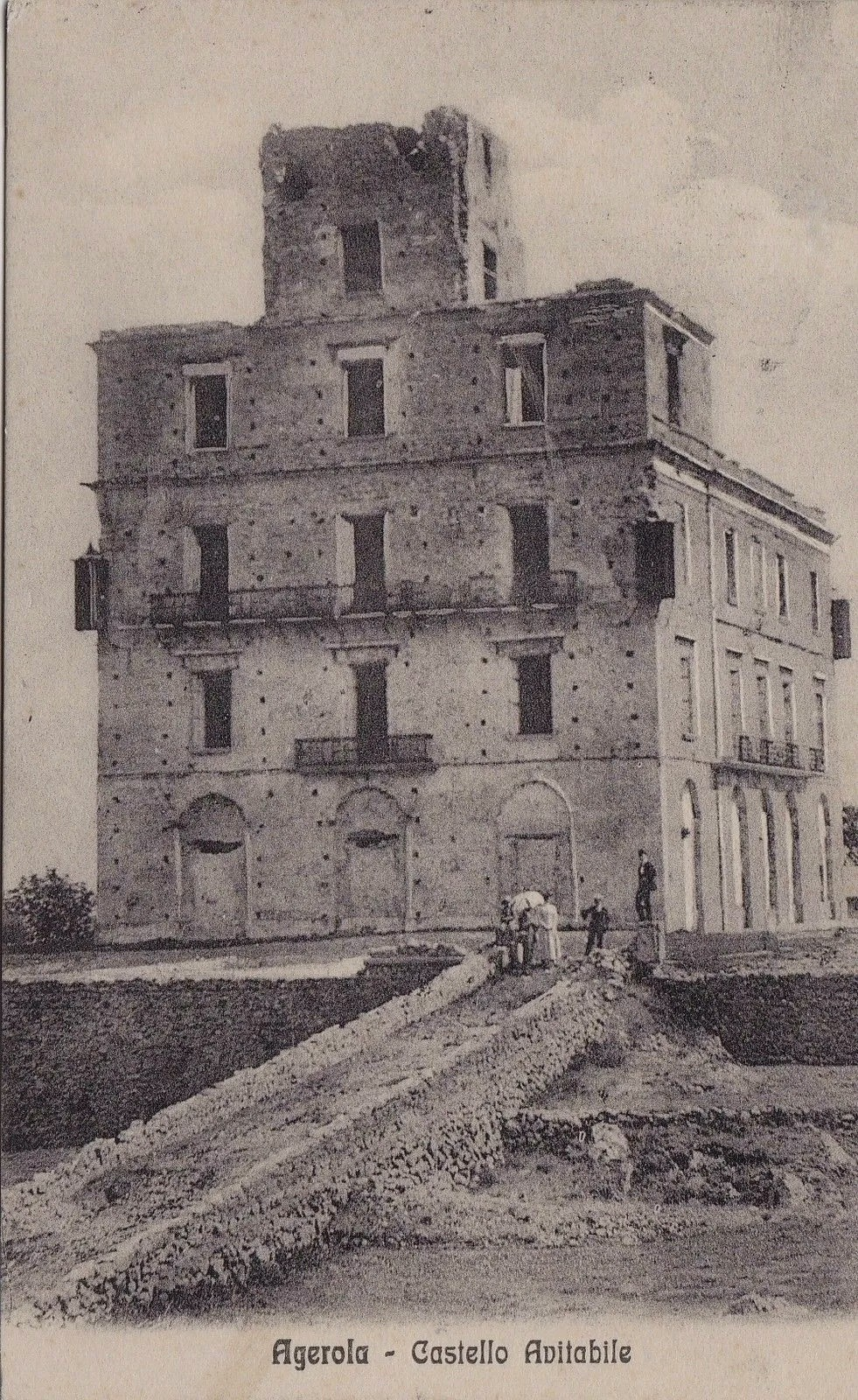
Postcard photograph of the castle of Paolo Avitabile in Agerola, Naples, ca.1913

As one of the few European adventurers in the area, he succeeded in building a fortune and getting away with it. He returned to Naples, where he built a grand home in San Lazzaro (Agerola). He obtained in 1844 that his place of birth, Agerola, was separated from Amalfi and united to the "Provincia di Napoli". He died in "strange" circumstances soon after marrying a local girl: Enrichetta Coccia. The following legal battle over his inheritance, and the many distant relatives asserting their claims, made Avitabile's cousin something of a byword in Italy.

== In fiction ==
Avitabile is a minor character in Flashman, a 1969 novel by George MacDonald Fraser. The narrator describes him as a "great, grey-bearded ox of a man... the Sikhs and Afghans were more scared of him than of the Devil himself."

== Honours and awards ==
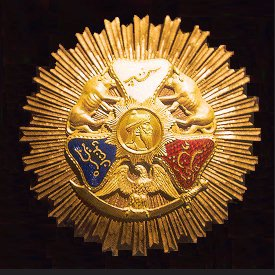
Order of Merit with a portrait of Ranjit Singh, introduced by Ranjit Singh, the first Sikh maharaja of the Panjab (1801–1839), inspired by the French Legion d’honneur worn by foreign military commanders

Avitabile won honours in every country he served. The inscription on his tomb at Agerola lists:

- Chevalier of the Legion of Honour
- Order of Merit of San Ferdinand of Naples
- Order of the Durrani Empire Afghanistan
- Grand Cordon of the Lion and the Sun
- Two Lions and Crown of Persia
- Auspicious Star of the Punjab

== See also ==
- Jean-Baptiste Ventura
- Fauj-i-Khas

== Sources ==
- Major Pearse, Hugh; Ranjit Singh and his white officers. In Gardner, Alexander (1999) [1898]. The Fall of Sikh Empire. Delhi, India: National Book Shop. ISBN 81-7116-231-2.
- Malatesta, Stefano (2002). Il napoletano che domò gli afghani. Vicenza, Italy: Neri Pozza. ISBN 88-7305-875-2.
- Nicola Forte: "Viaggio nella memoria persa del Regno delle Due Sicilie", ed. imagaenaria, p. 156, 2008, ISBN 88-89144-77-7, ISBN 978-88-89144-77-0.
- Antonio Lusardi, "Myth and reality of Paolo Avitabile, the last European Free Lancer in India", La Révolution française [En ligne], 8 | 2015, mis en ligne le 24 juin 2015, Consulté le 22 juillet 2017. URL:
