= Alexander Gardner (soldier) =

American mercenary (1785–1877)

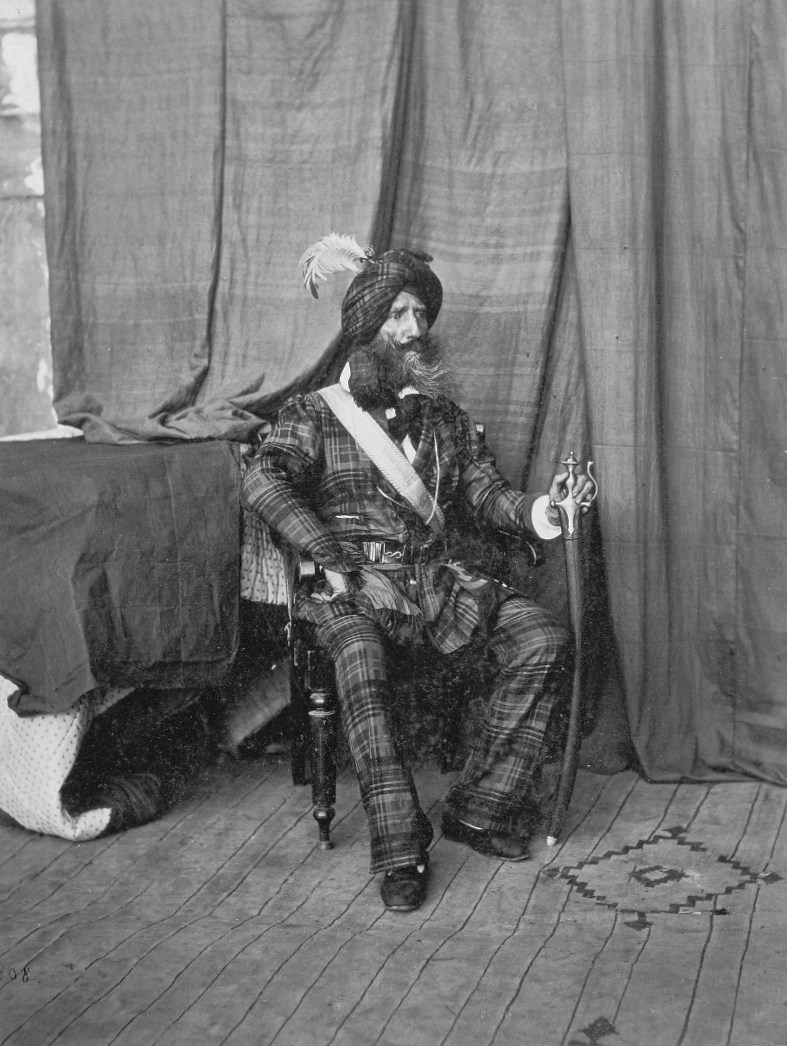
- Born: 1785
- Died: 1877; Jammu, Jammu and Kashmir, British India
- Military career
- Allegiance: Sikh Empire
- Branch: Sikh Khalsa Army/Artillery
- Service years: 1831–1849
- Rank: Colonel
- Nickname: Gordana Khan
- Units: Fauj-i-Khas

Colonel Alexander Haughton Campbell Gardner, also known as Gordana Khan (Persian: گوردانہ خان; Punjabi: ਗੋਰਦਾਨਾ ਖ਼ਾਨ; 1785–1877), was a traveller, soldier, and mercenary active in Afghanistan and Punjab. He served in various military positions in the region, most notably for the Sikh Empire of Ranjit Singh.

Details of his life remain obscure, though several colourful accounts have been written. Although corroborating evidence is sparse, Scottish historian John Keay wrote biographies in 1977, 1979, and, most thoroughly, The Tartan Turban: In Search of Alexander Gardner, in 2017.

== Biography ==
By Gardner's own accounts he was born in Wisconsin to a Scottish father and Anglo-Spanish mother. Baron von Hügel met Gardner in 1835 and claimed he was Irish. Whatever the case, evidence for Gardner's origins is uncertain.

Gardner went to Ireland in about 1809. He returned to America in 1812, but finding his father dead sailed for Europe and never went back to America. From Europe he travelled to Astrakhan in the Russian Empire where his brother was working. Upon his brother's death in 1817 Gardner tried to secure a position in the Russian Army. When that failed he left Russia and spent the next 13 years wandering through Central Asia.

In 1823 he was captured in Afghanistan by Habib Ullah Khan, the nephew of Dost Mohammed Khan. Habib Ullah was fighting his uncle for the throne of Kabul, and he recruited Gardner to his cause as the commander of 180 horsemen. After an attack on a pilgrim caravan Gardner married one of the captives, a native woman, and went to live in a fort near Parwan where a son was born. When Habib Ullah was defeated in 1826, Gardner's wife and his baby boy were murdered by Dost Mahommed's forces. Later that year Gardner fled north with a few companions and near the River Oxus his party was attacked by fifty horsemen: they lost eight out of their thirteen men and the survivors were all wounded but able to escape. Their route now lay towards Badakhshan and the valley of the Kokcha; the Oxus was finally crossed opposite the Shakhdara to reach the valley of Shignan. From this point his narrative is fragmentary and difficult to understand, large parts being highly improbable or impossible. He claimed to have reached Yarkand on 24 September but the year is uncertain, either 1827, 1828 or 1829 are possible, certainly he was there by 1830. He returned to Afghanistan, and visited Kafiristan, possibly the first westerner to do so. In August 1831 he left Afghanistan as an outlaw for the Punjab, where he was appointed Commandant of Artillery. He served in this position for many years before he was transferred to the service of Maharaja Ranjit Singh, where he was one of between 32 and 100 Western soldiers in Ranjit's army. He was later promoted to the rank of colonel by Maharaja Ranjit Singh.

The untented Kosmos my abode,
I pass, a wilful stranger:
My mistress still the open road
And the bright eyes of danger.

— Epigraph of Alexander Gardner's Autobiography

He remained in the Sikh Army after Ranjit Singh's death in 1839, until the First Anglo-Sikh War.

Gardner was involved in numerous gun and sword fights during his career. He was described as being six-foot, with a long beard, an all around warrior and fighter. Gardner was known to have saved the City of Lahore in 1841 when his comrades were killed or fled and he fired the guns that killed 300 enemies in the courtyard of Hazuri Bagh. He was present when Dhian Singh burst into the chambers of Maharaja Kharak Singh and murdered his favorite advisor.

Gardner remained in the service of the Maharajas as they came and went, and witnessed the fall of the Punjab as a sovereign kingdom. This he vividly described in his book on the Fall of the Sikh Empire.

He is described as continuing to suffer the effects of fourteen wounds in later life. He is supposed to have been difficult to understand due "variously to his lack of teeth, his liking for alcohol, his considerable age or the sing-song lilt of his rusty English; it could equally have been caused by the gash in his throat which was the most obvious of his many wounds and which obliged him to clamp a pair of forceps to his neck whenever he ate or drank."

== Works ==
Gardner kept a journal, much of which was lost. Extracts were published in 1853, and attracted controversy. His exploits were so bizarre that the geographer Sir Henry Yule disbelieved them. In later life, Gardner related his adventures to several prospective biographers, and after his death the surviving material was published in Soldier and Traveller: memoirs of Alexander Gardner; edited by Major Hugh Pearse.

== In fiction ==
Gardner appears as a major supporting character in the 1990 novel Flashman and the Mountain of Light. Parts of his journey, particularly his visit to Kafiristan, were added to the 1975 film The Man Who Would Be King.

== See also ==
- Josiah Harlan
