= Jean-François Allard =

1785–1839 French soldier and adventurer

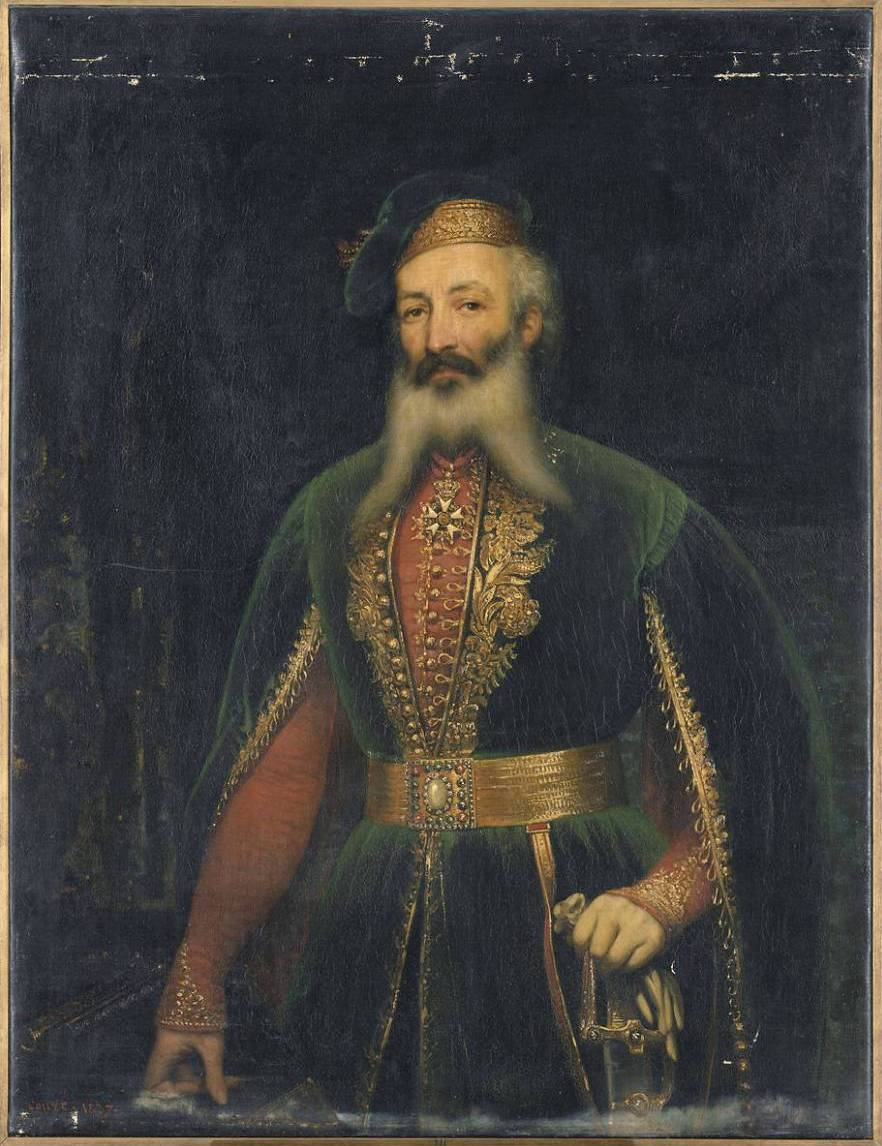
- Portrait of Jean-François Allard, by Joseph-Désiré Court, 1837

Personal details
- Born: 1785 Saint Tropez, Kingdom of France (present-day France)
- Died: 1839 (aged 53–54) Peshawar, Sikh Empire (present-day Khyber Pakhtunkhwa, Pakistan)
- Spouse: Princess Bannu Pan Dei
- Awards: Legion of Honour - Commander; Kaukab-i-Iqbal-i-Punjab

Military service
- Allegiance: First French Empire; Sikh Empire
- Rank: Captain
- Unit: 7th Hussar Regiment; Fauj-i-Khas
- Battles/wars: Battle of Waterloo

Jean-François Allard (French pronunciation: [ʒɑ̃ fʁɑ̃swa alaʁ]; 1785–1839), born in Saint Tropez, was a French soldier and adventurer. He was one of the prominent foreign officials of the Sikh Empire.

== Biography ==
=== France ===
Allard served in Napoleon's Army, where he was twice injured. He was promoted to the rank of Captain of the French 7th Hussar Regiment.

=== Persia ===
After the Battle of Waterloo Allard drifted, going to Persia where he visited Abbas Mirza to propose his services. He was promised the rank of Colonel, but never actually received the troops corresponding to his function.

=== India ===
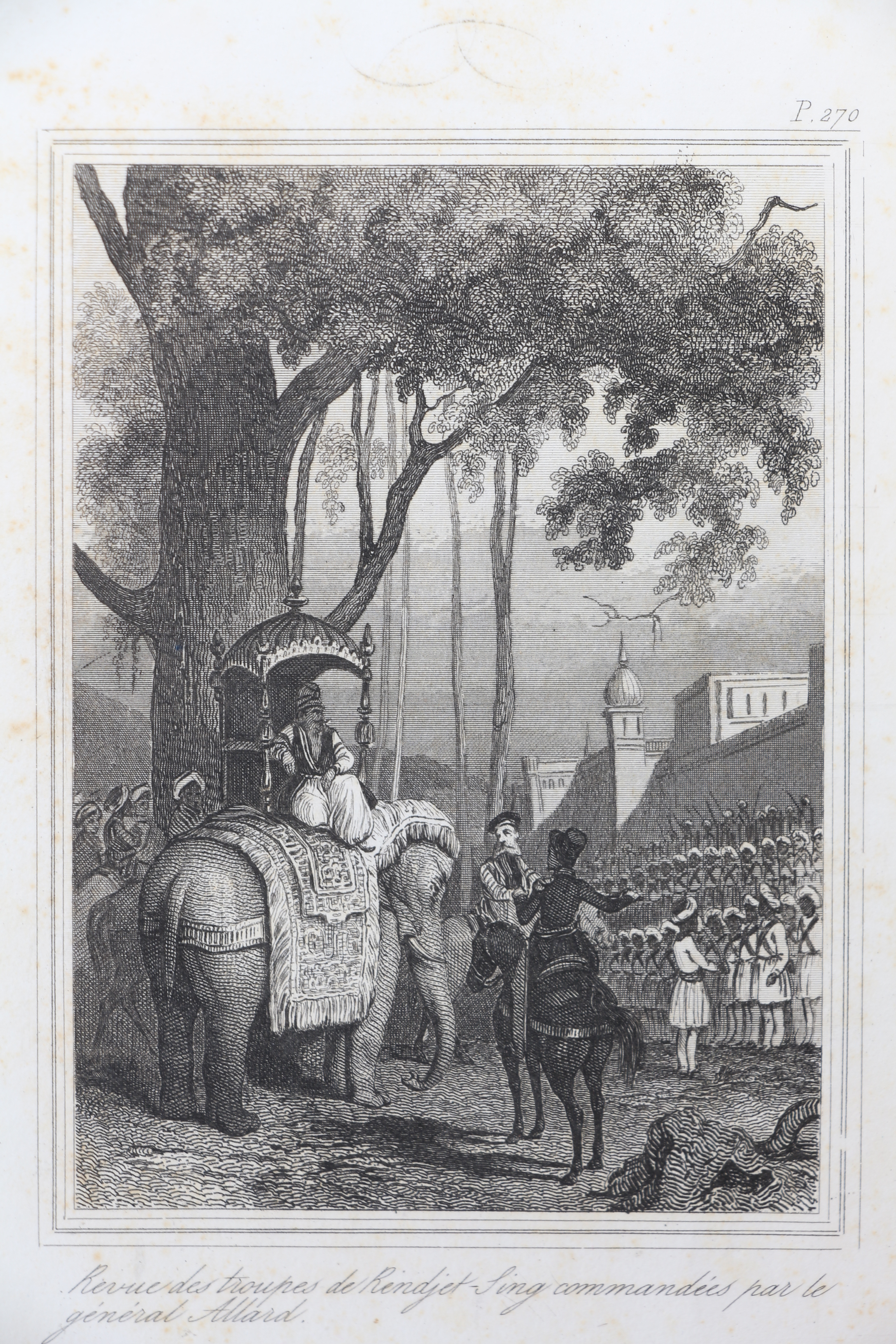
Maharaja Ranjit Singh reviewing General Jean-François Allard's troops, ca.1841

In 1820, Allard left for the Punjab, where in 1822 he entered the service of the Maharaja Ranjit Singh. He was commissioned to raise a corps of dragoons and lancers. On completion of this task, Allard was awarded the rank of General, and became the leader of the European officer corps in the Maharaja's service. While serving under Maharaja Ranjit Singh, he fell in love with Princess Bannu Pan Dei, daughter of Raja Menga Ram of Chamba, from the area that is now Himachal Pradesh. They married and eventually had seven children. In 1835, Allard returned to his hometown Saint-Tropez along with his wife and built "Pan Dei Palais" to commemorate their love. When he returned to India, to serve in Maharaja's army once again he left Pan Dei at Saint-Tropez, fearing that she might commit Sati, if he died on the battlefield in India.

Another European who took service in the Punjab with Allard in 1822 was the Italian Jean-Baptiste Ventura. They were joined four years later by the Neapolitan Paolo Di Avitabile, and the Frenchman Claude August Court. A Spaniard, by the name of Oms, also served with them for a period.

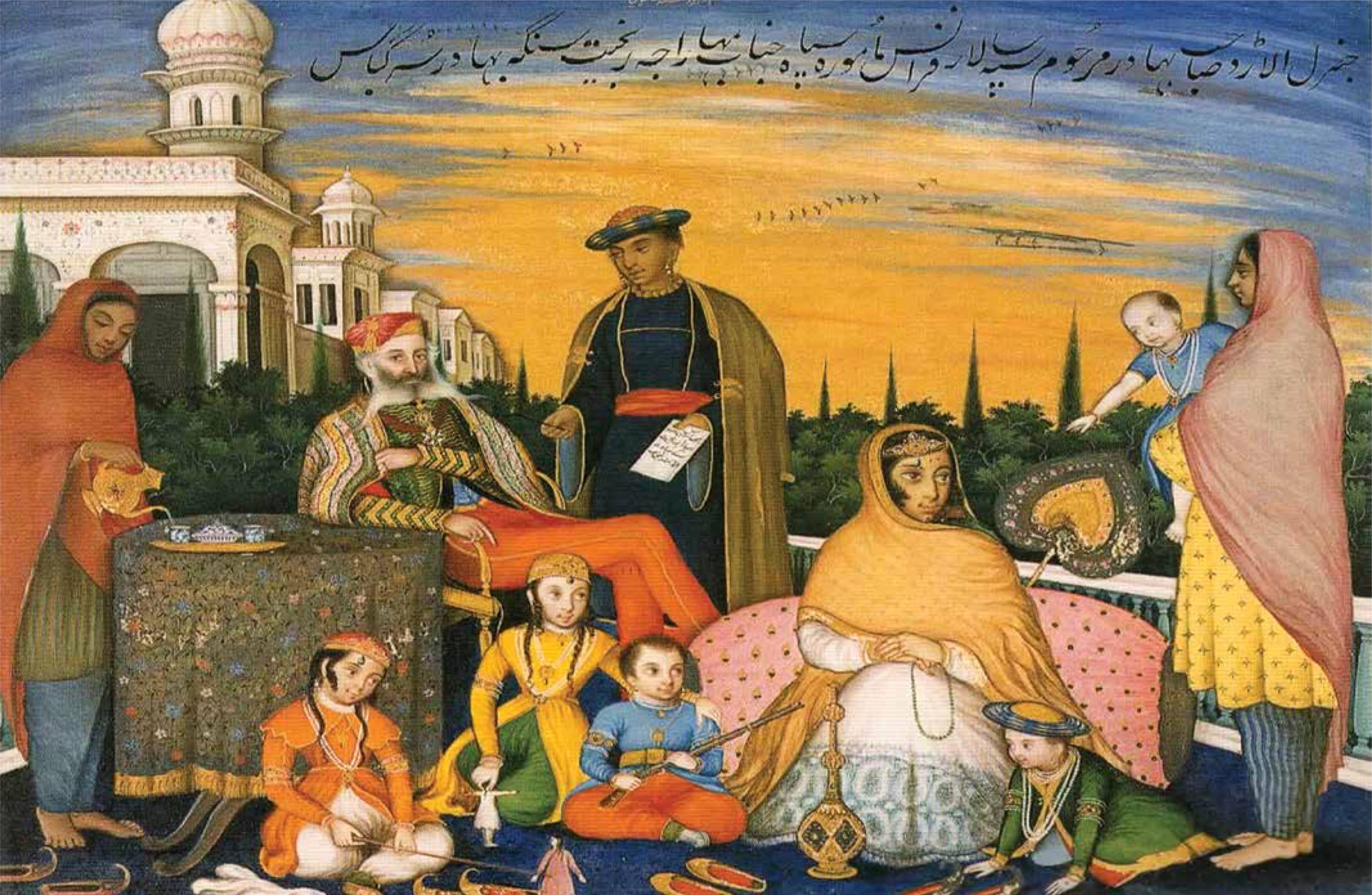
General Allard with family. Sikh painting, ca.1838

Allard was a charming and gentle man, very different from some of the other European mercenaries in the Punjab. He made the effort to learn Persian, and is said to have composed poetry in his new language.

He was an amateur numismatist, and contributed greatly to the early study of ancient Indian coins.

In June 1834, Allard returned to France on leave, going back to the Punjab 18 months later. He continued to serve the Maharaja until his death in 1839.

== Awards ==
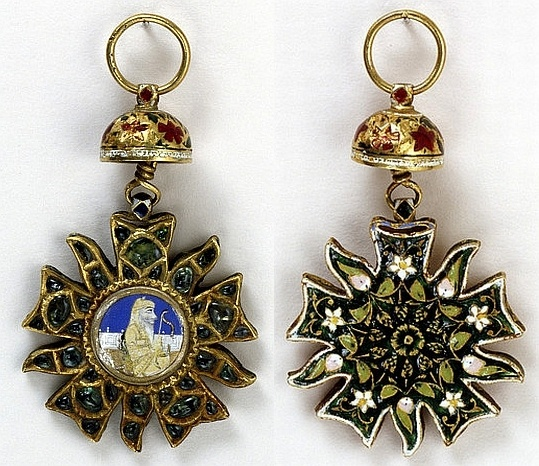
Preserved Kaukab-i-Iqbal-i-Punjab medal

On 27 February 1814, Allard was awarded a Knight in France's Legion of Honour by Napoleon Bonaparte. On 5 November 1832, his rank was promoted to Officer. On 20 October 1835, his rank for this award was promoted to Commander.

Allard was awarded the Kaukab-i-Iqbal-i-Punjab (Persian for Bright Star of Punjab) by Ranjit Singh.

== See also ==
- France-Asia relations
- Sikhism in France
- Legion of Honour
- List of Legion of Honour recipients by name (A)
- Legion of Honour Museum
