= Anglo-Sikh war =

Anglo-Sikh War may refer to:

- First Anglo-Sikh War, 1845–1846
- Second Anglo-Sikh War, 1848–1849

== See also ==
- Sikh war (disambiguation)
- Anglo Sikh war memorial, Punjab, India
