= Jean-Baptiste Ventura =

Italian soldier and mercenary

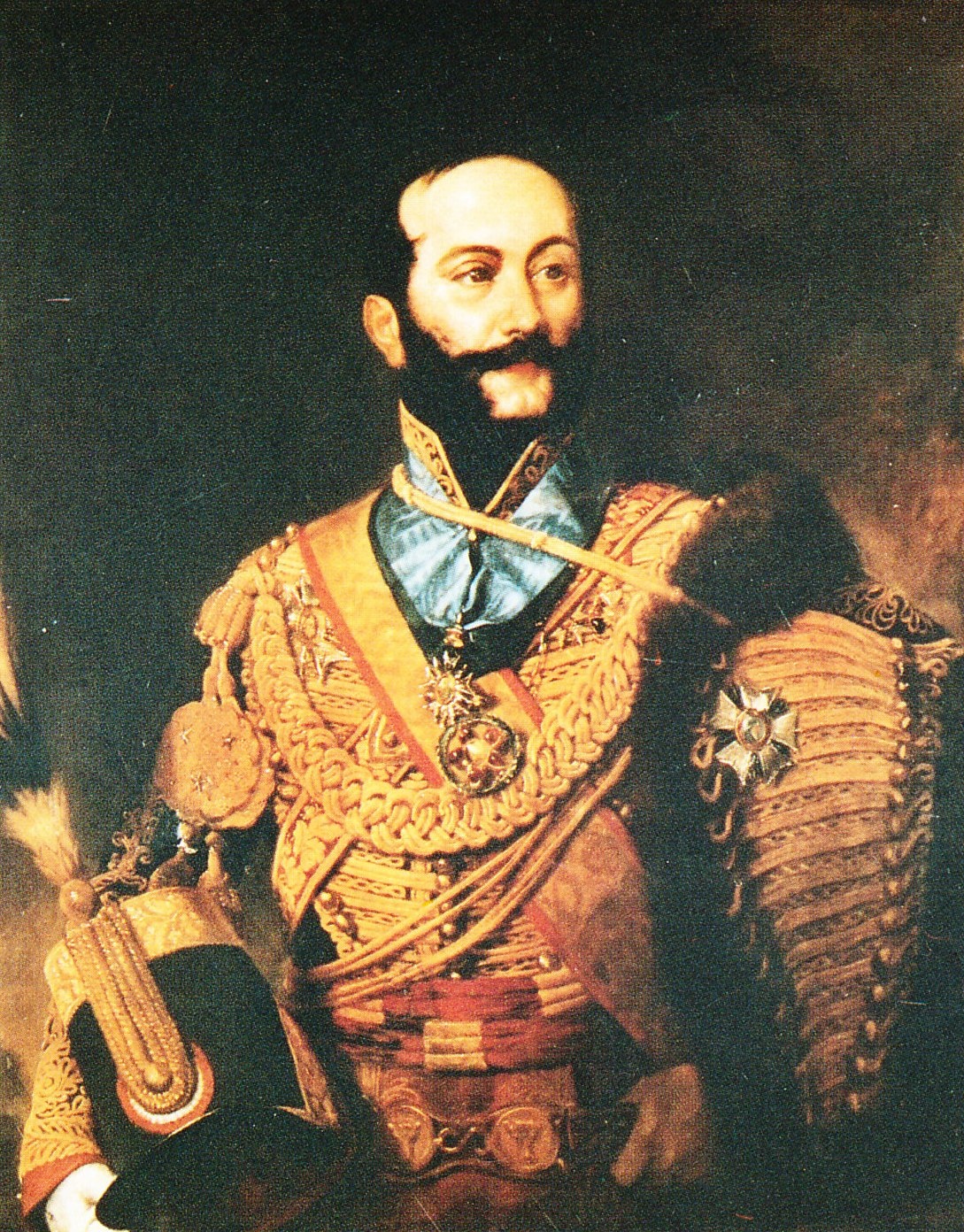
- Oil painting of Jean-Baptiste Ventura
- Born: Rubino Ventura; 25 May 1794; Finale di Modena, Duchy of Modena
- Died: 3 April 1858 (aged 63); Lardenne, France
- Spouse: Anna Moses
- Children: Victorine Ventura (daughter)
- Military career
- Allegiance: (Kingdom of Italy (Napoleonic)) Kingdom of Italy; First French Empire; Qajar Iran; Sikh Empire
- Rank: Governor of Lahore
- Awards: Legion of Honour

Jean-Baptiste (Giovanni Battista) Ventura, born Rubino (25 May 1794 – 3 April 1858), was an Italian soldier, mercenary in India, general in Maharaja Ranjit Singh's Sarkar-i-Khalsa, and early archaeologist of the Punjab region of the Sikh Empire. He was one of the prominent foreign officials of the Sikh Empire.

== Early life ==
Ventura was born in Finale di Modena (now Finale Emilia) in the Duchy of Modena to Gavriel Massarani, a Jewish merchant and Vittoria Massarani, a Catholic. The surname Ventura derives from Buonaventura, Italian for "Mazal Tov", a Hebrew-Sephardic surname originating in Iberia following the expulsion of the Jews in 1492. Ventura received a conventional Jewish education and at the age of seventeen, enrolled as a volunteer in the militia of the Kingdom of Italy, later serving with Napoleon's imperial army in the Queens's Dragons. After the abdication of Napoleon and the dissolution of the Army of Italy in April 1814 he returned to Finale. In 1817, his revolutionary and Napoleonic sympathies became known to the local authorities following a dispute between him and a member of the reactionary Ducal police. As such, he was obliged to leave the country.

In 1817, persecuted by the local authorities for his revolutionary ideas and his sympathies for Napoleon, he had to flee from Finale because of an argument between him and a member of the reactionary police of the Duke of Modena Francesco IV. He went first to Trieste, and then to Constantinople, where he was for a time a ship-broker. He changed his name to Jean-Baptiste to hide his Jewish origins.

Having learned that Persia was seeking the services of European soldiers, he obtained a commission as an officer and helped train the Shah's army with European military methods. He soon obtained the rank of colonel in the army of Prince Mohammad Ali Mirza, the Shah's son. Upon the death of the Shah in 1822, Ventura offered his services to his successor, Abbas Mirza. In the latter's service, however, were a number of English officers who were decidedly hostile to the French; they considered Ventura to be French because he had fought under Napoleon. As a result of their political intrigues, Ventura was dismissed.

== Serving the Maharaja of Punjab ==
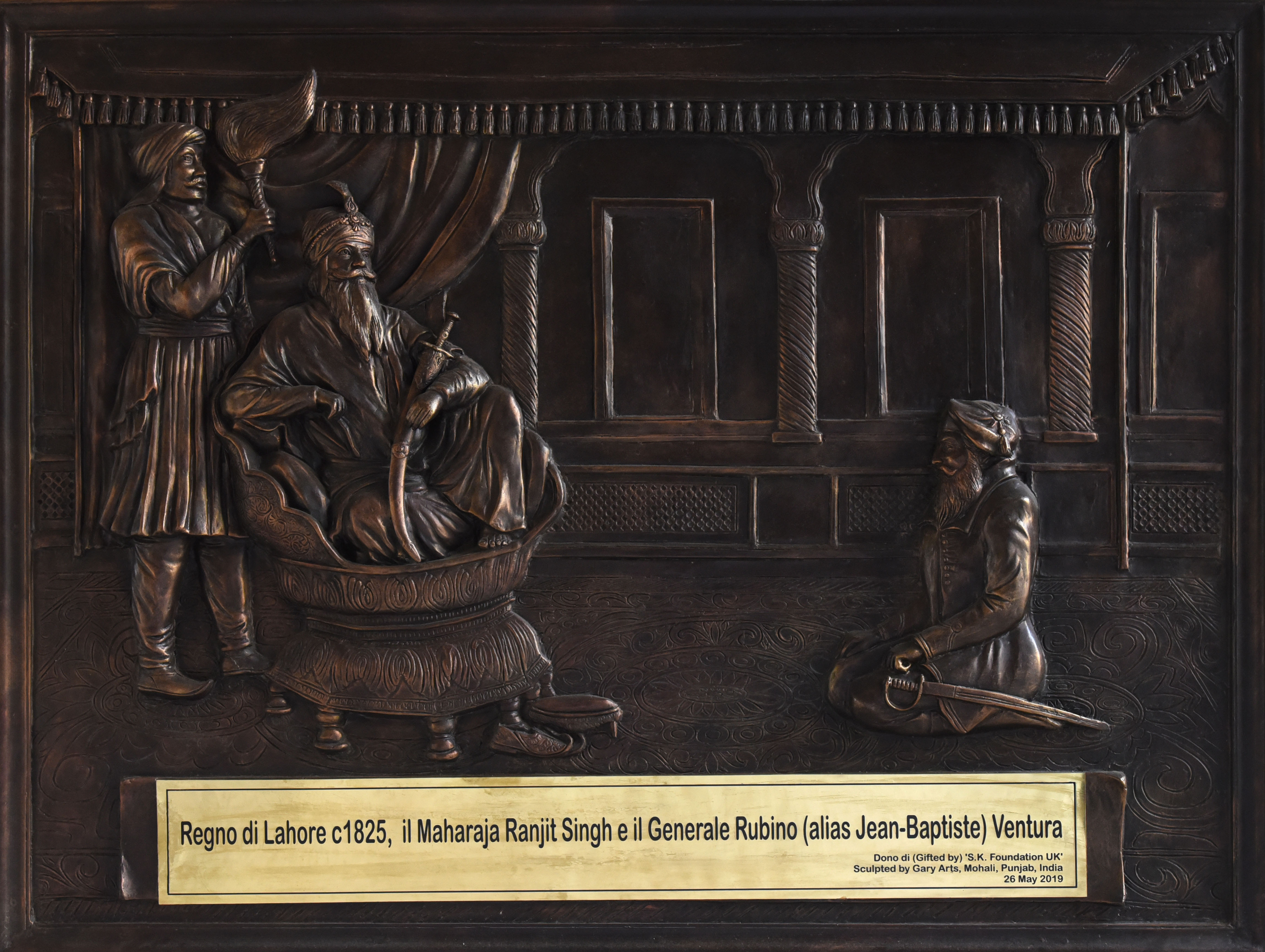
General Rubino Ventura and Maharaja Ranjiit Singh in Lahore in 1825

He traveled east, ending up in Lahore alongside Jean-François Allard in 1822. They took service with Maharaja Ranjit Singh, the ruler of Punjab, as the Maharaja was encouraging veterans from erstwhile Napoleon's army in a bid to modernize his Sikh Khalsa Army in European warfare.

In March of the following year both Allard and Ventura commanded the Maharaja's troops in the Battle of Nowshera, where they defeated the Afghan army and captured Peshawar. Following a rebellion in Afghanistan, Ventura commanded several difficult campaigns and greatly expanded the boundaries of the kingdom of Punjab.

Along with Jean-Francois Allard, Paolo Avitabile, and Claude Auguste Court, Ventura formed a group of European officers responsible for modernizing the Sikh army and training and commanding the Fauj-i-Khas, the European-model brigade of which Ventura was the commander. Ventura was highly esteemed by the Maharaja, and in addition to the rank of General he was appointed Kazi (i.e., Supreme Judge), and Governor of Lahore. He quickly rose through the ranks at the court and became the de facto Commander in Chief of the Darbar forces.

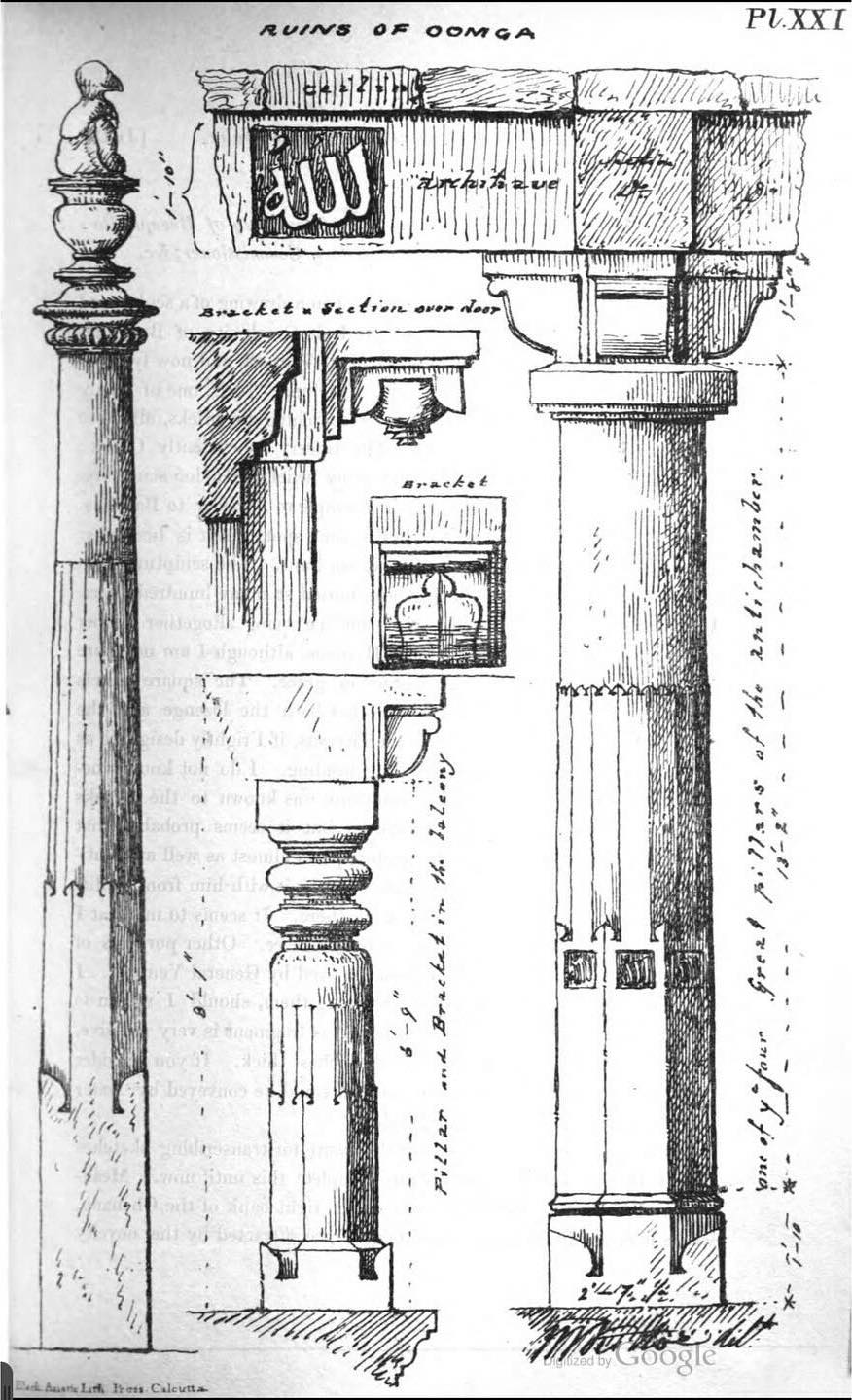
Ruins of an Indo-Greek temple, found by General Ventura, published in the Journal of the Asiatic Society of Bengal, 1838

Ventura married Anna Moses in Ludhiana, a lady of Armenian origin by whom he had a daughter named Victorine, but he always wanted to return to his country of origin. In 1838 he went on a diplomatic mission to Paris and London, but was called back to Lahore before he had time to visit his family in Italy. An educated and eclectic man, he devoted himself to archeology, and in 1830 he was the first ever to explore a stupa, that of Manikyala, where he recovered numerous coins and relics, some of which are now on display at the British Museum in the King Edward the 7th Gallery. He spent his spare time in Peshawar exhuming Bactrian, Greek and Kushan coins from Hindu temples and Buddhist stupas in the Khyber Pass, making numerous excavations then sending the findings on to the Asiatic Society of Bengal in Calcutta.

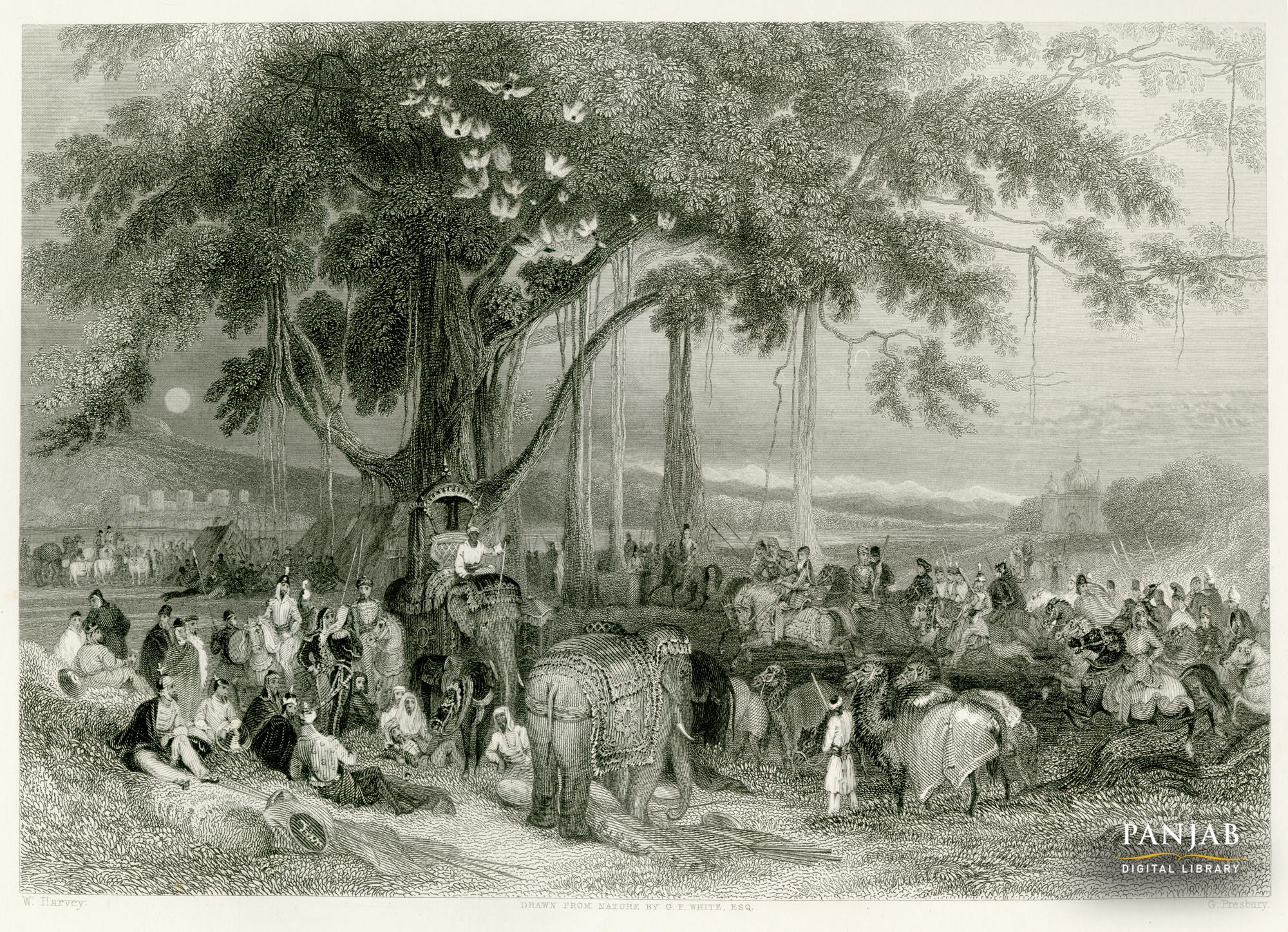
A late night gathering of Sikhs with Maharaja Ranjit Singh and General Ventura outside the walls of Lahore, ca.1830

He served faithfully under Ranjit Singh and his successors Kharak Singh, Nau Nihal Singh, and Sher Singh. Upon Maharaja Sher Siṅgh's assassination in September 1843, he left the Punjab.

== Later life ==
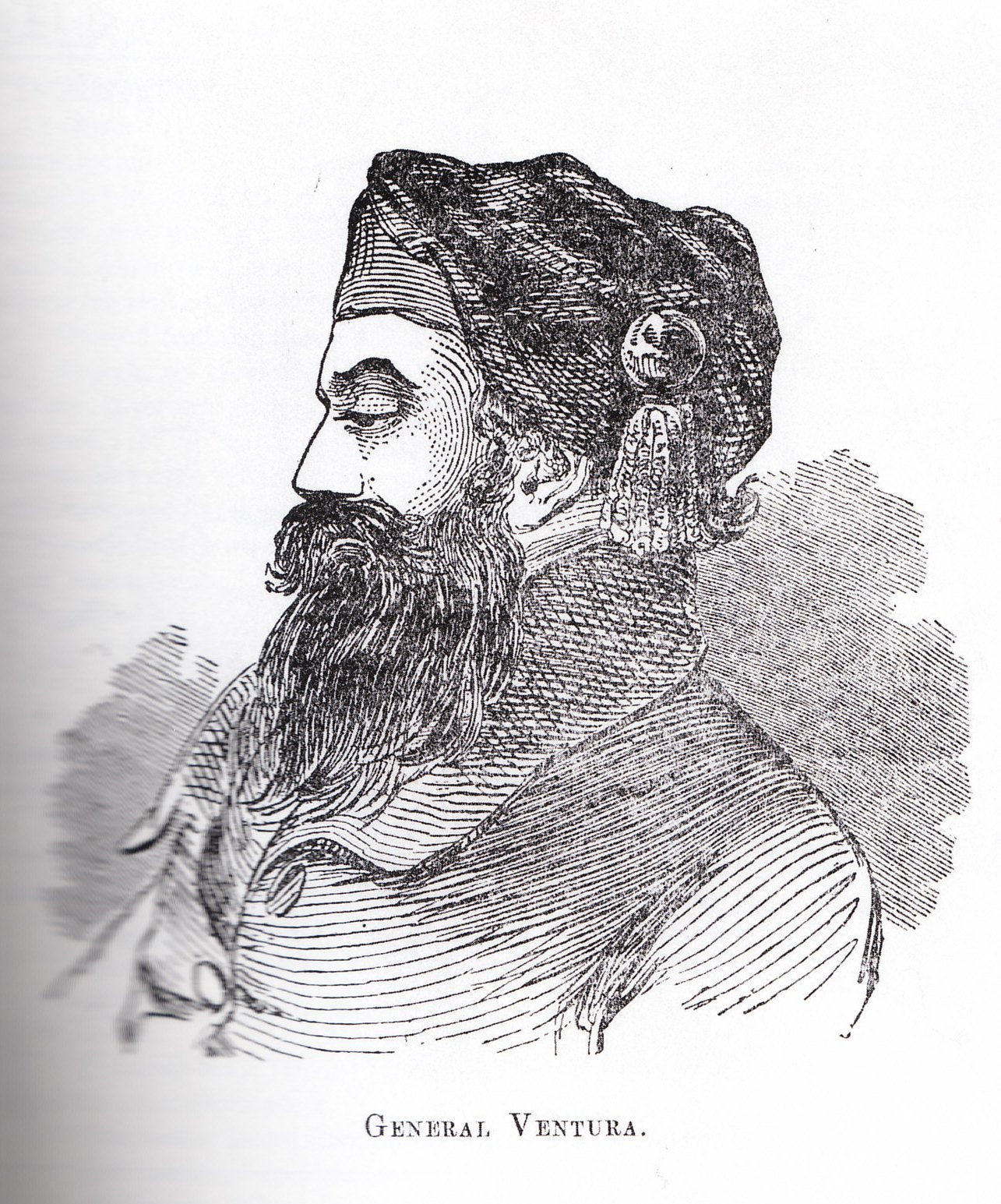
Sketch from Charles Grey's European Adventurers of Northern India (Lahore: 1929)

In France, he presented King Louis Philippe with a set of ancient Greek coins which he had unearthed. These coins were taken as evidence of Alexander the Great's march through Afghanistan and the Sindh-Punjab region of ancient India.

In his later years he lost a part of his large fortune in unsuccessful commercial enterprises. According to Flaminio Servi, Ventura was baptized toward the end of his life.

Ventura moved into an estate in Toulouse that had a vineyard amounting to 23 acres. He personally resided, with his daughter and Maria Raynal, in a mansion named Château Mandy. Anne Ventura was given a pension of 250 rupees per month from the General's income sourced from his jagir in he cis-Sutlej region and taken from the treasury of Lahore.

He died on 3 April 1858 in Lardenne, near Toulouse, France.

== Awards ==
He received the French Legion of Honour from the King Louis Philippe I in 1835.

== Monuments ==
A monument donated by the Sikh community was inaugurated on May 26, 2019. It was placed in Via Ventura in Finale Emilia opposite the house in which the General was born. It is a bas-relief which represents Ventura with Maharaja Ranjit Singh with dimensions 160x120 cm, sculpted in India.

== Sources ==
- Balboni, Maria Pia; “Ventura. Dal ghetto del Finale alla corte di Lahore”, Biblioteca Nuova serie, Pagine VIII-212, Aedes Muratoriana, Modena, 1993;
- Balboni, Maria Pia, “Il generale Rubino Ventura. La straordinaria vita di un ebreo del Finale al servizio del maharaja Ranjit Singh”, Baraldini editore, Finale Emilia, 2019;
- Notizie Storiche e Biografiche del Generale Rubino Ventura, Finalese, Esposte da un Suo Concittadino, Finale (Emilia), 1882;
- F. Servi, in Corriere Israelitico, x. 47 et seq.;
- idem, in Vessillo Israelitico, xxxi. 308 et seq.;
