= Foreign officials of the Sikh Empire =

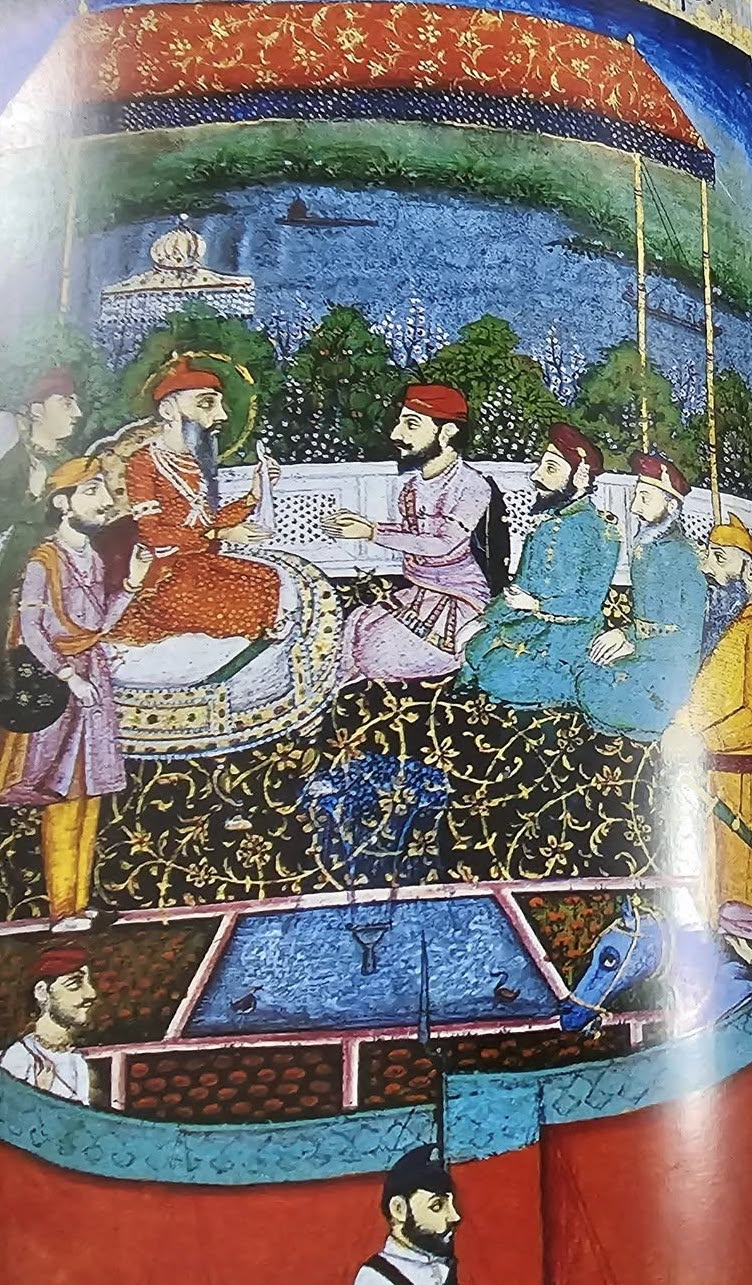
Detail of a painting of Maharaja Ranjit Singh seated in darbar, including with his European generals Jean-Baptiste Ventura and Jean-François Allard, from his military manual, ca.1822–30

The Sikh Empire of the northwestern Indian subcontinent employed many foreigners, mostly Europeans and some Americans, in its administration and military. Fixty-two Europeans served in the Sikh Khalsa Army, coming from English, Russian, Spanish, Greek, German (incl. Prussian), French, and Austrian-backgrounds. The nationality with the largest representation in the Sikh Empire were the French, with there being sixteen French officers of the Sikh army. The foreign officials were known as Firanghis (meaning "foreigner") and served in various roles, such as generals, military advisors, administrators, and physicians. There were nearly a hundred Westerners in total and they were mostly adventurers and soldiers.

Western/European officers from various backgrounds, including Britishers, Frenchmen, Germans, Italians, Spaniards, Americans, and Russians, also rose to high levels within the Sikh court in many instances. However, the Sikh court was wary of the Westerners within the court, and kept them therefore under strict regulation. These foreign Western members of the court were persuaded by the state to integrate themselves by marrying a local woman, settling down within the empire, swearing loyalty to the Sikh state, and adopt the cultural customs of the locals, such as growing out a beard or wearing a turban. The Western members of the court were also banned from publicly consuming beef or smoking. The Westerners adopted a mixture of both European and Punjabi clothing and some chose to wear Punjabi weapons on their person.

== Military ==
After the fall of Napoleon, the generals Ventura and Allard joined the services of Maharaja Ranjit Singh in 1822. They helped reform the jagirdari cavalry along European lines. Generals Ventura and Allard were responsible for establishing the Fauj-i-Khas unit, with Allard commanding three regiments in his brigade while Ventura controlled five divisions. Meanwhile, Claude-Auguste Court was tasked with setting-up an artillery division of the Sikh army, which had three brigades by 1830. Colonel Francois Henry Mouton and Signor Colonel Domingo Hurbon were given the job of engineering a pontoon bridge for the Sikh Army at the Battle of Sobraon in 1846 during the First Anglo-Sikh War. Signor Colonel Domingo Hurbon was one of the European officials who remained serving the Sikh Empire until its very end.

French cavalry officers of the Sikh army included General Allard, Commander de la Roche, Mouton, Mr Garron (or Carron), Messrs de Facieu (father and son) and Captain Argoud. The infantry wing consisted of Captain de la Font, Mr Amise, Mr Dubuignon, Mr de la Ust, and Mr Gervais, while General Court took-care of the artillery operations.

== Doctors ==
Three foreign doctors were recorded as being on the payroll of the Sikh army: the Transylvanian Johann Martin Honigberger, a Frenchman called Benet, and an Englishman called Harvey. Dr Benet was employed shortly as Maharajah Ranjit Singh's medical physician and the surgeon-general of the Sikh army.

== List of foreigners who served the Sikh Empire ==
Alexander Gardner and Hugh Wodehouse Pearse list the following foreign military and medical officers:

Number	Name	Nationality	Role
Military officers
1	General Ventura	Italian	Infantry
2	General Allard	French	Cavalry
3	General Avitabile	Italian	Infantry
4	General Court	French	Artillery
5	General Harlan	American	Infantry
6	General Van Cortlandt	English	Infantry
7	Colonel Ford	English	Infantry
8	Colonel Foulkes	English	Cavalry
9	Captain Argoud	French	Infantry
10	Colonel Canora	American	Artillery
11	Colonel Thomas	Anglo-Indian	Infantry
12	Lieut.-Col. Leslie, alias Rattray	Anglo-Indian	Infantry
13	Colonel Mouton	French	Cavalry
14	Colonel Hurbon	Spanish	Engineer
15	Colonel Steinbach	English (?)	Infantry
16	Captain de la Font	French	Infantry
17	Captain M'Pherson	English	Infantry
18	Mr Campbell	Anglo-Indian (?)	Infantry
19	Mr Garron (Carron ?)	French	Cavalry
20	Gordon	Anglo-Indian	Cavalry
21	De Fasheye (father)	French	Cavalry
22	De Fasheye (son)	French	Cavalry
23	Alvarine	Italian	Infantry
24	Hommus	Spaniard	Infantry
25	Amise	French	Infantry
26	Hest	Greek	Infantry
27	De la Roche	French	Infantry
28	Dubuignon	French	Infantry
29	John Holmes	Anglo-Indian	Infantry
30	Vochus	Russian	Infantry
31	De l'Ust	French	Infantry
32	Hureleek	Greek	Infantry
33	Fitzroy	—	Infantry
34	Barlow	—	Infantry
35	Martindale	Anglo-Indian	Infantry
36	Jervais	French	Infantry
37	Mævius	Russian	Infantry
38	Bianchi	Italian	Infantry
39	Dottenweiss	German	Engineer
Medical officers
1	Dr Harvey	English	Drew 500 rupees per mensem in 1838.
2	Dr Benét	French	Drew 500 rupees per mensem in 1838.
3	Dr Martin Honigberger	Austrian	Drew 900 rupees per mensem same year. A clever doctor, an enterprising traveller, and an amiable man; author of an interesting work, 'Thirty-five Years in the East.'

Gurnam Singh Gill lists the following foreigners based upon the Mahan Kosh:

Number	Name	Nationality	Role
1	Alvarine	Italian	Infantry
2	Allard	French	Cavalry
3	Amise	French	Infantry
4	Argowed	French	Infantry
5	Avitabile	Italian	Civil employment
6	Battice	Italian	—
7	Barlow	English	Infantry
8	Bianchi	Italian	Medical Officer
9	Benet	French	Medical Officer
10	Canora	American	Artillery
11	Court	French	Artillery
12	Cortlandt	English	Infantry
13	Campbell	English	Infantry
14	Dottenweiss	German	Engineer
15	Dubuignon	French	Infantry
16	De l' Ust	French	Infantry
17	De l' Roche	French	Infantry
18	De la Font (1st)	French	Infantry
19	De la Font (2nd)	French	Infantry
20	De Fasheye (father)	French	Cavalry
21	De Fasheye (son)	French	Cavalry
22	Ferris	French	Cavalry
23	Foulkes	English	Cavalry
24	Fendrid	—	—
25	Ford	English	Infantry
26	Fitzroy	—	Infantry
27	Gillmore	English	—
28	Gordon	English	Cavalry
29	Guthrie	—	—
30	Gardner	Irish	Artillery
31	Garron	French	Cavalry
32	Hommus	Spaniard	Infantry
33	Honigberger	German	Medical Officer
34	Harlan	American	Civil employment
35	Holmes	English	Infantry
36	Hest	Greek	Infantry
37	Hureleek	Greek	Infantry
38	Hurbon	Spaniard	Engineer
39	Hurbon	English	Medical Officer
40	Jervais	French	Infantry
41	Leslie (alias Rattray)	English	Infantry
42	Mouton	French	Cavalry
43	Martindale	English	Infantry
44	Moevius	Russian	Infantry
45	Metui	Russian	Infantry
46	Macpherson	English	Infantry
47	Rossalx	French	Engineer
48	Steinbach	Austrian	Infantry
49	Starr	Austrian	Infantry
50	Sheaf	Austrian	Infantry
51	Thomas	English	Infantry
52	Ventura	Italian	Infantry
53	Vochus	Russian	Infantry
54	Weir	Russian	Infantry

== Prominent figures ==
=== French ===
- Jean-François Allard (1785 – 1839)
- Claude-Auguste Court (1793 – 1880)
- François Henri Mouton (1804–1876)

=== Italian ===
- Jean-Baptiste Ventura (1794 – 1858)
- Paolo Avitabile ("Abu Tabela") (1791 – 1850)

=== Spanish ===
- Domingo Urbón de Alcántara (1811 – 1851)

=== Austrian ===
- Johann Martin Honigberger (1795 – 1869)

=== American ===
- Alexander Gardner (1785 – 1877)
- Josiah Harlan (1799 – 1871)

== See also ==
- Gora Kabristan, Lahore
