= Veer Singh Dhillon =

Sikh general (c. 1792–1842)

Veer Singh Jallaha
- Born: c. 1792; Gurdaspore
- Died: 1842 (aged 49–50); Gurdaspore
- Military career
- Rank: General
- Conflicts: Afghan-Sikh Wars
- Awards: Jallaha of Gurdaspore

Veer Singh Dhillon (c. 1792–1842) was a Sikh who was born in Gurdaspore, Punjab. He was a general in the Sikh Khalsa Army, army of Maharaja Ranjit Singh, and was the founder of one of the most highly honoured Sikh warrior families.

Veer Singh was awarded the title Jallaha (Duke) of Gurdaspore after his army single-handedly won the eastern areas of Punjab for the Maharaja. Later when the Sikh Empire fell to the British forces, the armies of the Jallaha of Gurdaspore (then under the son of Veer Singh) were not defeated due to their strong defenses. But later the British signed a treaty with the ruler in which his areas would come under the British Empire but the Jallaha would still remain the supreme commander of the military forces and also the chief administrator of the area.

== Early life ==
Veer Singh was born in a Dhillon Jat family, and was raised a Nihang. He was a master in the art of Gatka a Sikh martial art. At an early age his family was forced out of Gurdaspore (now Gurdaspur a district in Punjab) after the Raja of Kapurthala attacked the rather peaceful town. Later Veer Singh led his armies against the Raja, and won back Gurdaspore.

== Military career ==
Dhillon participated in the following conquests: Sialkot, Kasur (1807), Multan (1818), Kashmir (1819), Pakhli & Damtaur (1821–2), and finally Gurdapore (1831). He served as the governor of Peshawar for a short period and was later Jallaha (duke) of Gurdaspore.
