= Claude Auguste Court =

French soldier, mercenary and archaeologist

- Born: Claude-Auguste Court; 24 September 1793; Saint-Cézaire-sur-Siagne, France
- Died: 21 January 1880 (aged 86); Paris, France
- Education: École Spéciale Militaire de Saint-Cyr
- Occupations: Soldier, mercenary, numismatist
- Known for: Serving as a General in the Punjab Army under Maharaja Ranjit Singh of Punjab

Claude Auguste Court (24 September 1793 – 21 January 1880) was a French soldier, mercenary, and archeologist. He served as an army officer under Napoleon I from 1813–1818. He was one of the prominent foreign officials of the Sikh Empire. He was hired by Maharaja Ranjit Singh of Punjab in 1827 to organize and train the artillery along European lines. He was promoted to the rank of general, and served as one of the leading European officers in the Sikh Army. He served the Sikh Empire until 1843, where-after he returned to his native France. Aside from his military career, Court is also remembered for his work in numismatics and archeology.

== Early life ==
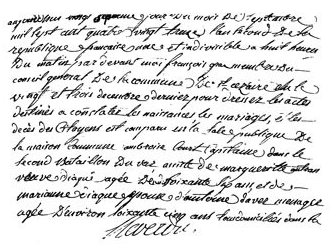
Birth record of Claude-Auguste Court, Saint-Cézaire-sur-Siagne, France, 1793

Court was born at Saint-Cézaire-sur-Siagne (located near Grasse), France, on 24 September 1793. Other sources claim he was born on September 26th instead. He was the son of Monsieur Andre Ambroise Court and Madame Marguerite Diaque. (Note: Other sources spell the last name of his mother as 'Diagues'.) He had an older sister named Marie Court. Court's father had served as a Captain in the 2nd Battalion of the French Army. He spent his entire youth in his native village. He entered a special military school, the École Spéciale Militaire de Saint-Cyr, studying there from 24 April 1812 to 13 January 1813. Other sources claim he entered this school on 24 August 1812 at the age of 19. Some earlier works claim he was educated at the Ecole Polytechnique in Paris, which is incorrect.

== Military career in Europe ==
After finishing his education, Court joined the French Army as a sub-lieutenant (second lieutenant) in the 15th régiment de Ligne on January 30, 1813, he joined his corps on February 9, 1813. He served in two campaigns in the French military. He first served in the 151st Infantry Regiment of Line in Halle located in Saxony-Anhalt, Germany, prior to the Battle of Leipzig. During the Battle of Leipzig, he received a wound on his left leg on 28 May 1813 after being shot in it that would continue to cause him pain from time to time. Thereafter, he was transferred to 68th Infantry Regiment of Line.

In 1813, some of the regiment's battalions served in the Spanish and Portuguese armies. In the 6th corps of the Grande Armée and in the Bavarian observation corps, Court took part in the campaigns of 1813–1814.

The Guide Napoléon mentions that he fought in 1814 near Courtrai, which would exclude the February 1814 fighting in France and the siege of Strasbourg.

=== List of European battles and expeditions ===
A list of European battles and expeditions that Court participated in are as follows:

- April 28, 1813: Affair of Halle (Westphalia)
- May 2, 1813: Capture of Leipzig
- May 19, 1813: Battle of Weissig/Königswartha
- May 20, 1813: Battle of Bautzen
- May 21, 1813: Battle of Würschen (2nd day of Bautzen)
- May 26, 1813: Battle of Haynau (Silesia)
- September 28, 1813: Battle of Meissen
- October 16-18-19, 1813: Battle of Leipzig
- October 29-30, 1813: Battle of Hanau
- February 10, 1814: Battle of Champaubert
- February 11, 1814: Battle of Sens
- February 14, 1814: Battle of Vauchamps
- February 27, 1814: Battle of Bar-sur-Aube
- March 5, 1814: Fight in front of Soissons
- March 6, 1814: Provins battle
- March 14, 1814: Battle of Reims
- April 8, 1814: Defense of Strasbourg

== Departure from France ==
After Napoleon's defeat at Waterloo in 1815 he was dismissed from service. He left France in 1818 for Baghdad and joined the Persian forces which were trained at Kermanshah by a handful of ex-officers of Napoleon's army, including Jean-Baptiste Ventura. While in Persia, he met Paolo Avitabile through a contact, another Neapolitan adventurer, and together Court, Ventura and Avitabile travelled on to Lahore, arriving there in early 1827.

== Military service in the Sikh Empire ==
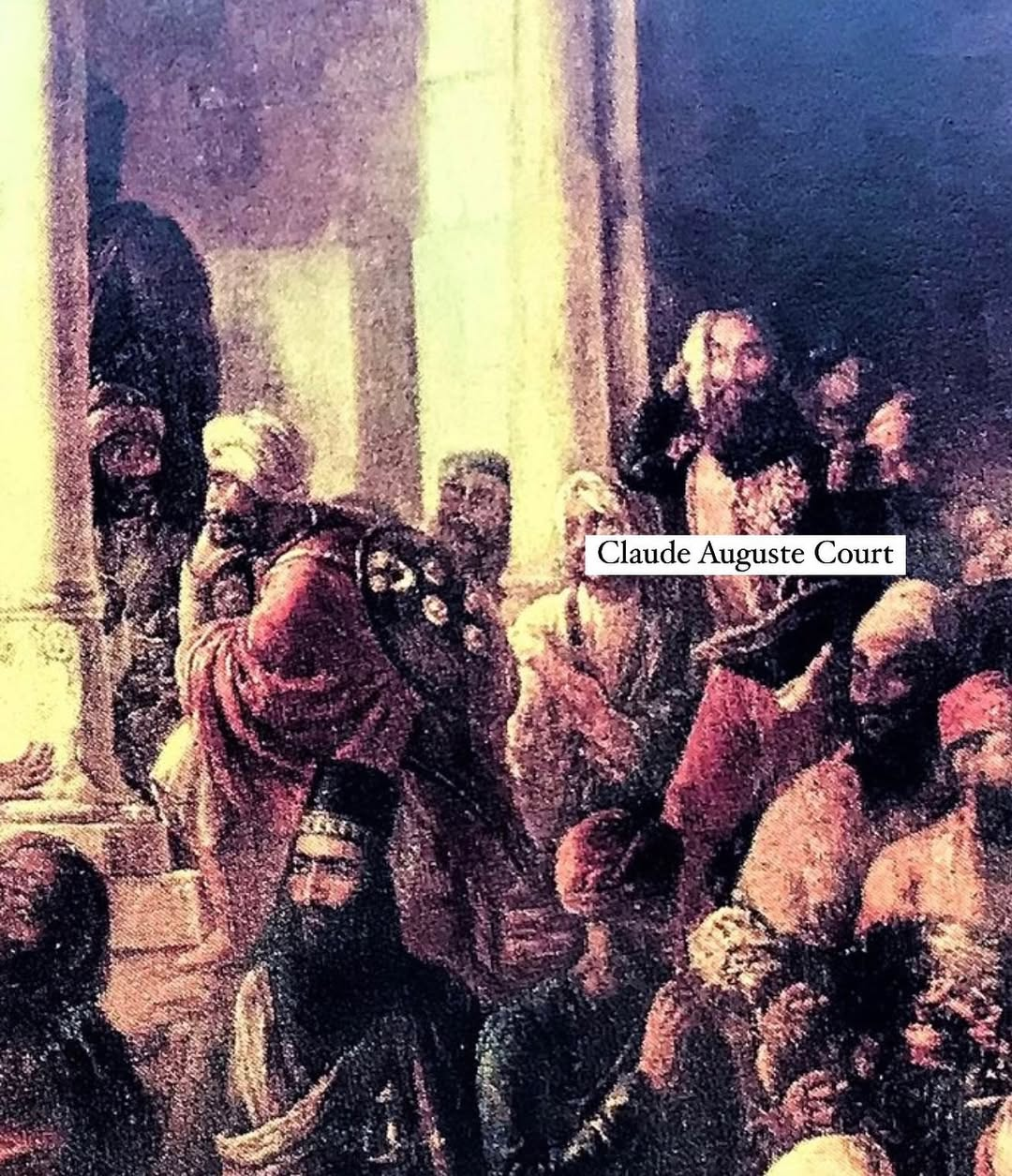
Detail of Claude Auguste Court, from 'The Court of Lahore', by August Schoefft, ca.1840's–1855, Vienna, after drawings made at Lahore, ca.1841–55

Maharaja Ranjit Singh gave Court employment in the artillery befitting his talents and scientific attainments. Court was responsible for the training of artillerymen, the organization of batteries and the establishment of arsenals and magazines on European lines. He was appointed director of the foundries, with the task of organizing the artillery and manufacturing cannons according to European models. The Maharaja had his own foundries for casting guns and for the manufacture of shells. Court supervised these in collaboration with Sardar Lehna Singh Majithia. When Court produced the first shell at the Lahore foundry, the Maharaja bestowed upon him a prize of Rs 30,000, and when he produced the fuse, he was rewarded with an award of Rs 5,000. Court received a salary of Rs 2,500 per month, besides a jagir.

As early as 1822, Allard and Ventura created and commanded the Fauj-i-khas, or special (in the sense of royal) brigade, for the ruler of the Punjab, with five infantry regiments, three cavalry regiments and a powerful artillery unit (the Top Khana). In 1826, Court and Avitabile joined them, each creating their own brigade and, in Court's case, reshaping the entire artillery of the Punjab army. These “French” units, as they were called by both the Punjabi population (Francisi kampu, Francisi sarwar) and British intelligence (the French Legion), grew to 15,000 elite troops - around a third of the Sikh Empire's regular forces.

These special, disciplined units were entrusted with particularly delicate or dangerous missions, ranging from the surveillance of sensitive frontiers, such as the Anglo-Sikh border or that with Baluchistan, to the military occupation of the kingdom's last major province, Peshawar, annexed by General Court, who commanded two French brigades in a particularly rapid operation in 1834. With rare exceptions, the province of Peshawar remained under “French” command from 1834 to 1843, when the French generals left Punjab to return to Europe. Court was promoted to general in 1836. General Allard, commander of all French units in the kingdom, was also the Maharaja's political advisor on foreign affairs.

Claude Auguste Court continued to serve the State after the death of Maharaja Ranjit Singh. After the death of Kanvar Nau Nihal Singh on 5 November 1840, Court along with Ventura sided with Sher Singh who was installed as Maharaja, with their help in investing the Fort of Lahore, on 20 January 1841.

=== List of Indian battles and expeditions ===
- Battle of Peshawar (1834)
- Battle of Jamrud (1837)

== Later life and death ==
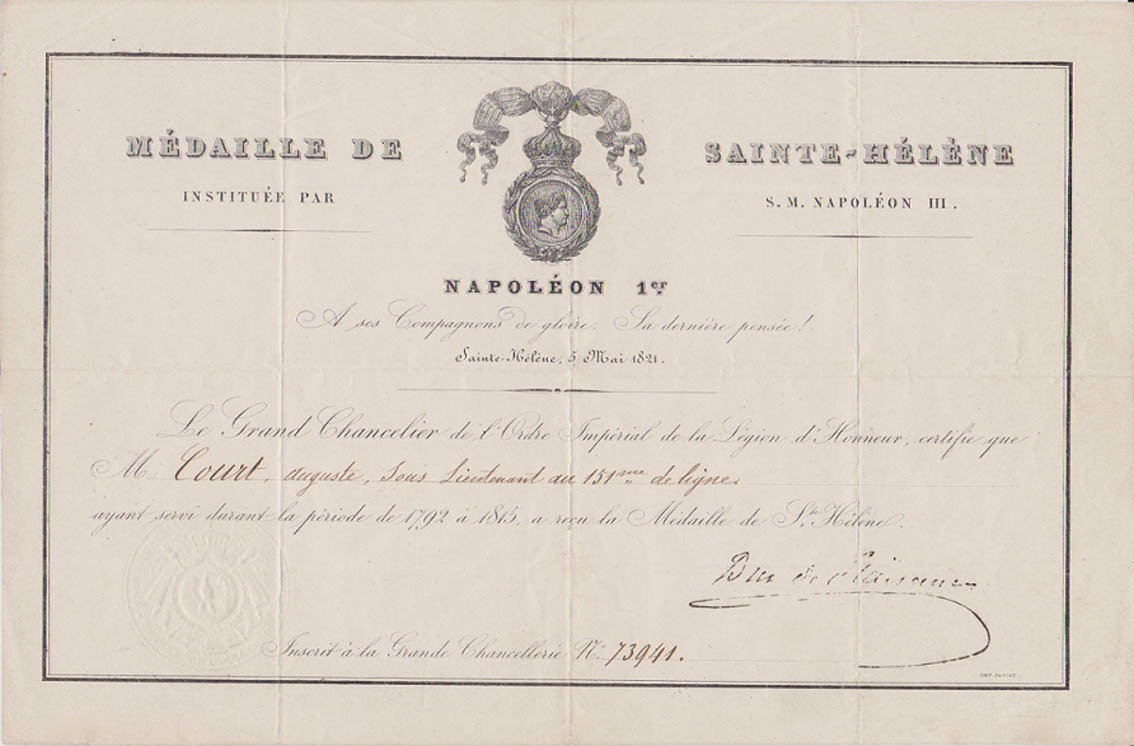
Médaille de Sainte-Hélène award certificate of Claude-Auguste Court

After Maharaja Sher Singh's assassination in September 1843, he fled to Firozpur, in British territory, and, ultimately securing his discharge from the Sikh Army, proceeded with his Kashmiri wife, Fezli Azam Joo and their children to France in 1844. He purchased an estate in the countryside and a residence in the city of Paris where he lived for the rest of his life. The estate in the countryside was in Marseille at no. 144 rue Sylvabelle, purchased in 1859. He died in Paris on 21 January 1880 at Avenue Daumesnil 207, aged 86. He was buried in Marseille's Saint Pierre cemetery on 25 January 1880 in plot 6 north, row 4, grave no. 13, CP no. 1912.

== Marriage ==
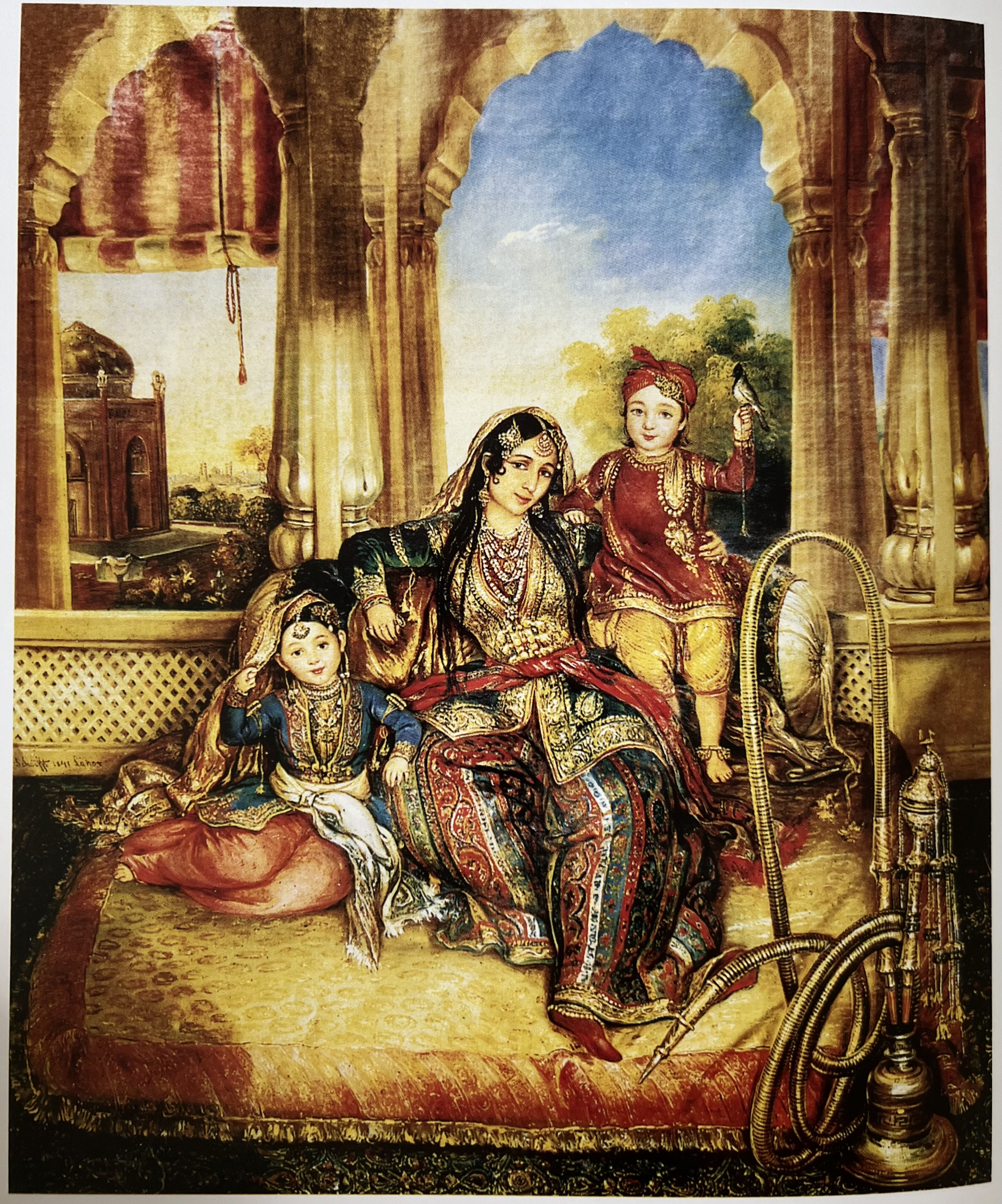
Painting of General Claude Auguste Court's Kashmiri wife, Fazli Azam, with their two sons

A limited number of obligations were imposed on the foreign officers, the most senior of whom, the French and Italian generals, occupied key positions at the top of the military and political hierarchy of the empire: to wear a beard, not to smoke, and to marry local ladies was what Ranjit Singh courteously but firmly demanded of them. The request to marry a local woman was believed to bind the Europeans to the Punjab, making them more loyal. General Jean-François Allard and Court were both monogamous and only married one woman. General Court is said to have married a beautiful and young Kashmiri Muslim woman named Fezli Azam Joo (daughter of Fezli Azam Khan) around 1836, with there being little known about her.

His wife bore three children:

1) Pauline Joséphine Court

2) Alexandre Court

3) Louis-Philippe Court

In 1843, Court took his young wife and their first three children with him to France. General Court remarried Fezli Azam Khan in Marseille, France on 17 June 1844. One of the witnesses to the re-marriage was General Allard's brother, Benjamin Allard, Knight of the Legion of Honor. A fourth child, Marie Amélie Court, was born in Marseille, France to the couple on 3 January 1845.

Fezli Azam Joo died on 4 February 1869, and was buried in the family tomb in the Saint-Martin Cemetery, then transferred to the Saint-Pierre Cemetery, where she lies with General Court and her children.

== Archeological pursuits ==
Court created the first archeological surveys and maps of the Punjab and its neighbouring northwestern areas, as far as Kabul. He was the first person to excavate and record Buddhist sites of the region and collected coins of the area.

== Interest in numismatics ==
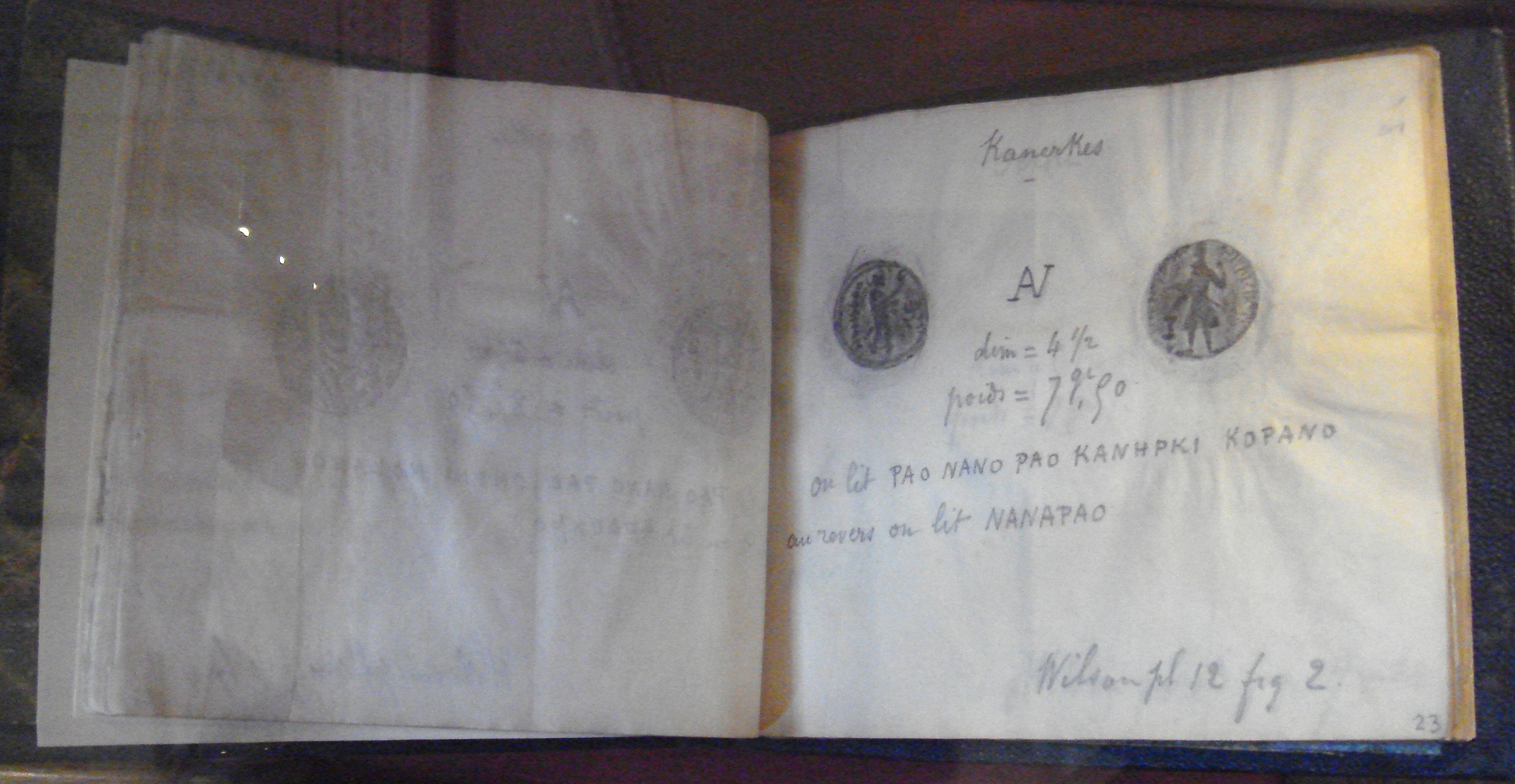
Book of rubbings of Kushan coins, by Claude Auguste Court, between 1827 and 1844. British Museum.

Court was one of the first Europeans to become interested in the coins of South Asia, which he collected from 1829. Part of the collection was described in Revue Numismatique in 1839 and Court talks of his coin collection in his valuable Memoires published in Paris in 1856–57. Court died in Paris in January 1880 leaving his heirs his rich coin collection. After the death of Court, his collection of coins he had gathered during his colourful life vanished. We know almost nothing of its fate since then until three albums came to light in an English provincial book sale in 1994 of three small albums entitled La collection numismatique du General Court. The albums were subsequently purchased by the British Museum and they contained 627 coin rubbings, allowing many of Court's coins to be identified. These had been bought by a coin collector and the later head of the Archaeological Survery of India (ASI) who had served in the British army, Alexander Cunningham, sometime after 1880, whose collection was acquired by the British Museum in 1888–94. Cunningham may also have owned the albums.

== Awards ==
- Officer of the Legion of Honor
- Knight of the Grand Order of the Sun and Khan of Persia
- Médaille de Sainte-Hélène (due to being a veteran of the Grande Armée)

== Bibliography ==
- Court, Claude-Auguste. La collection numismatique du General Court. – 3 volumes of coin rubbings

== See also ==
- Paolo Avitabile
- France-Asia relations
- Fauj-i-Khas
- Ranjit Singh
