= François Henri Mouton =

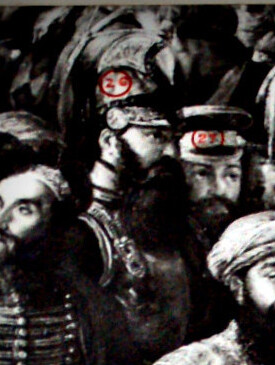
- François Henri Mouton, detail from a photograph of a section of 'The Court of Lahore', by August Schoefft, ca.1840's–1855, Vienna, after drawings made at Lahore, ca.1841–55, with identifications for some of the figures
- Born: 17 August 1804; Montélimar, France
- Died: 9 November 1876 (aged 72); Algiers, French Algeria
- Military career
- Allegiance: France; Sikh Empire
- Branch: French Army; Sikh Khalsa Army
- Service years: 1822–1865; 1839–1846
- Rank: Colonel; Military advisor
- Conflicts: First Anglo-Sikh War (1845–1846); Crimean War (1853–1856)
- Awards: Legion of Honour (officer); Order of the Medjidie (4th class)

François Henri Mouton (17 August 1804 – 9 November 1876) was a French Army officer. In his early career he served in the Garde du Corps and the Spahis, reaching the rank of captain before being placed on half-pay in 1838. He was one of the prominent foreign officials of the Sikh Empire.

Mouton entered the service of the Sikh Khalsa Army, through contact with Jean-Baptiste Ventura who served as a military adviser to Sikh Maharaja Ranjit Singh. Mouton was placed in command of a unit of cuirassiers and fought with them in the Guler and Mandi hills. He survived an abduction attempt by Sikh rebels but returned to France after Maharaja Sher Singh was assassinated in 1843.

Mouton travelled back to India in 1844 seeking employment and, after initially being refused entry, was eventually made military adviser to the Sikh commander Tej Singh. Later that year the Khalsa came into conflict with the British during the First Anglo-Sikh War. Mouton was the only European adviser to remain with the Sikh army throughout. He fought at the battles of Ferozeshah and Sobraon and helped plan the entrenchments used by the Khalsa in both engagements. At the end of the war he was captured in the Sikh capital, Lahore, and deported by the British.

Mouton returned to France in 1846 and published an account of his service in India. He rejoined the French Army and was granted a position with the Chasseurs d'Afrique. Mouton was appointed a chevalier of the Legion of Honour in 1848. He served as a staff officer during the Crimean War for which he was rewarded with appointment to the Ottoman Order of the Medjidie and advanced to the rank of officer in the Legion of Honour. Mouton retired, as a colonel, in 1865.

== Early life and career ==
François Henri Mouton was born on 17 August 1804 at Montélimar in the Drome department of France. He volunteered to join the French Army in 1822 and was appointed a second lieutenant in the Garde du Corps, the bodyguard of Charles X, in 1826. Mouton was promoted to lieutenant in the Spahis, African light cavalry, in 1830 and became a captain in 1835. He was placed on half-pay in 1838, no employment being available for him in the army. At this time the French adventurer Jean-Baptiste Ventura was home on leave from his position in the military service of Sikh Maharaja Ranjit Singh. Mouton asked that Ventura find him a position with the Sikh Army, the Khalsa, to which Ventura agreed.

== With the Sikh Khalsa ==
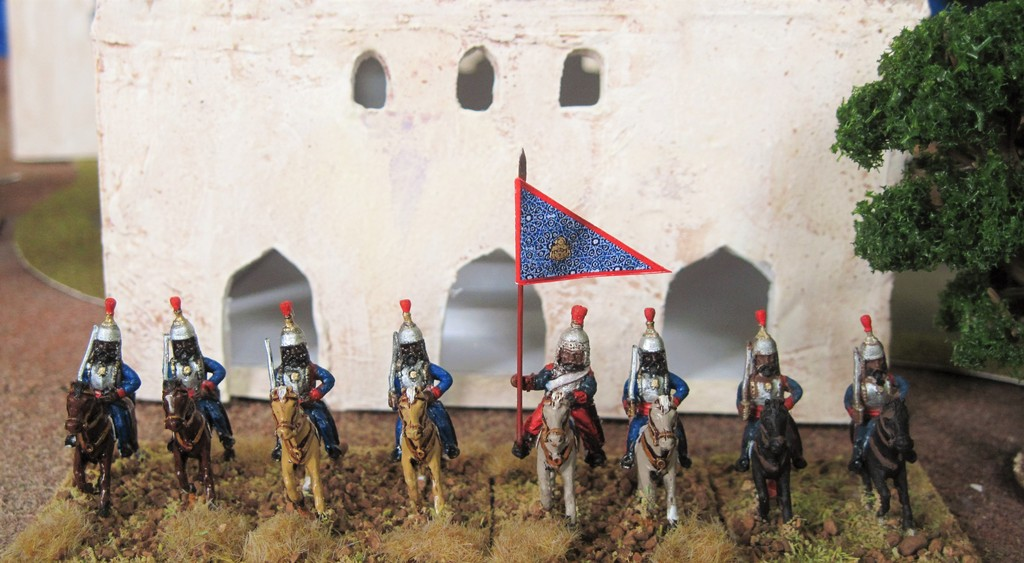
Models of Sikh cuirassiers of this period

When Mouton arrived in the Punjab the Sikh cavalry under the command of another Frenchman, Jean-François Allard, was in the process of reorganisation. This gave a perfect opportunity for Mouton to be found a position and he was appointed to command the Sikh cuirassiers, on a salary of 800 rupees a month. Around this time Mouton married, probably to a Muslim Kashmiri woman. Mouton and his men were posted to the Sikh capital, Lahore, in 1839.

Soon afterwards he was sent to fight, under Ventura, on operations in the Guler and Mandi hills. Due to the steep terrain it is likely that Mouton and his cavalrymen fought dismounted. Whilst on this service in February 1841 disaffected members of the Khalsa murdered another European officer named Foulkes. The rebels infiltrated Mouton's camp and demanded his surrender. Some of Mouton's men sided with the rebels but others, encouraged by the pleas of Mouton's wife, came to his defence and drove the attackers off. Mouton's wife persuaded the cuirassiers to escort the couple to Lahore where the men were rewarded with a bonus; they were afterwards posted to Peshawar because of lingering doubts over their loyalty. The then Maharaja of the Sikhs, Sher Singh, was soon afterwards murdered and all the Europeans in his service resigned or took leave.

Mouton returned to France where he married Louise Brigitte Jolly in 1844. Later that year he returned to India, accompanied by two officers seeking service with the Khalsa, Chevalier Bartoluni and Mr Serize. At Ferozepur, where all foreigners seeking to enter the Punjab were required to report, the men were refused entry. His two companions returned to France but Mouton went instead to Bahawalpur from where he managed to reach Lahore. He could not find employment until September 1845 when the Sikh commander in chief, Tej Singh, appointed him as a military adviser.

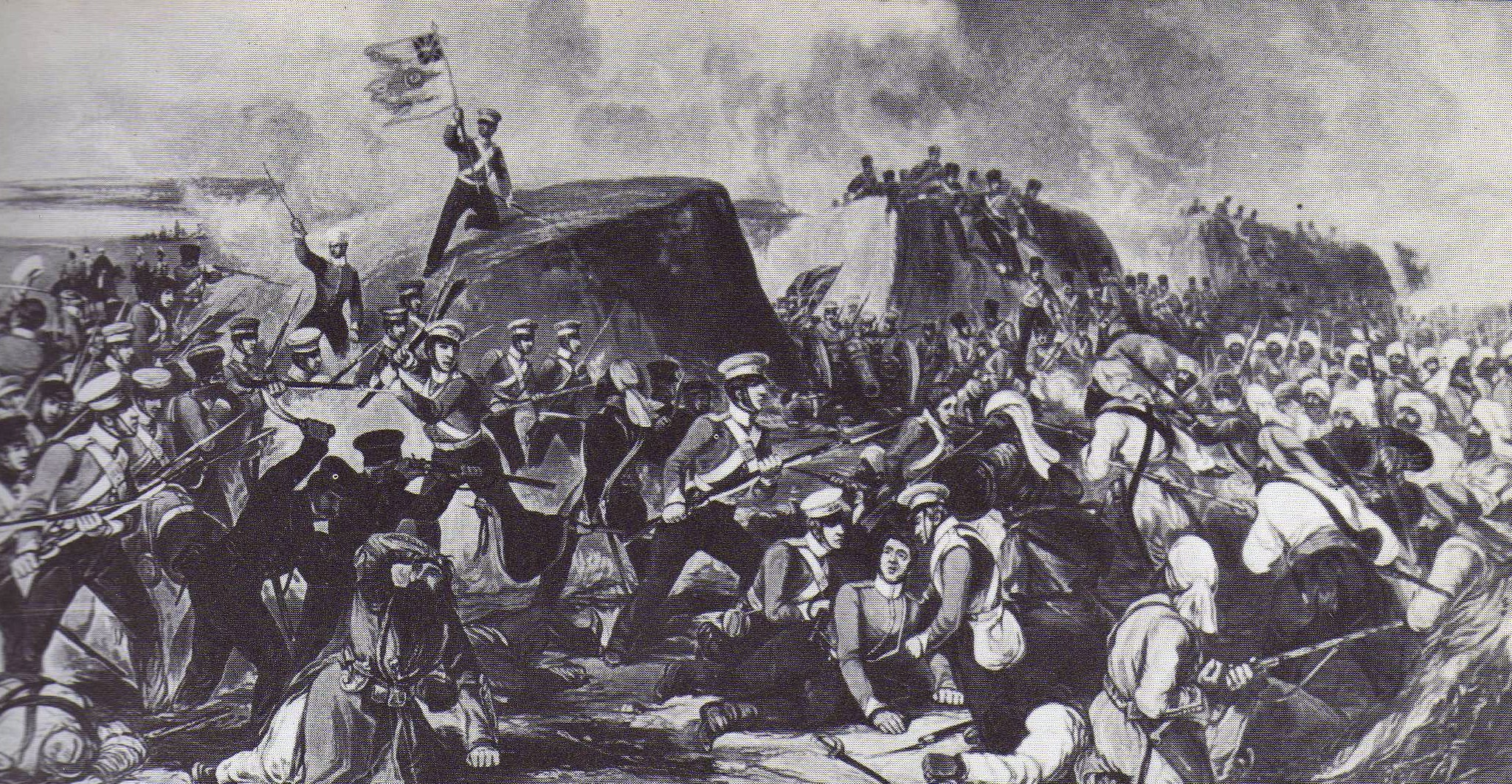
The British assault the defences at Sobraon

The First Anglo-Sikh War broke out soon afterwards and Mouton became the only European officer to remain with the Khalsa throughout. With the Spanish engineer Hurbon he planned the entrenchments used by the Khalsa during the Battle of Ferozeshah. These were described by the British variously as excellent or atrocious, though the British general Hugh Gough called them "well constructed" and noticed his artillery had little effect upon them. Mouton advised Tej Singh to attack the British prior to the Battle of Sobraon, while they were awaiting reinforcements, but was ignored. He assisted with the planning and construction of the defences used during that battle, which he allegedly assured Tej Singh were impregnable. During the battle, the last of the war, the British suffered 1,100 casualties in their assault but were victorious. Mouton escaped to Lahore where he was captured by the British and deported to France in 1846.

== Later life ==
In 1846, soon after his arrival in Paris, Mouton published a report on his time in India, in which he described himself as the commander of the Sikh Khalsa's regular cavalry. He returned to the French Army, from which he had been considered on leave and which generally appreciated the service of its personnel with the Sikhs. He was appointed a captain in the 1st Regiment of the Chasseurs d'Afrique and made a chevalier of the Legion of Honour on 18 October 1848. Mouton served as a staff officer during the Crimean War (1853–56) and was honoured for this service with the award of the Order of the Medjidie 4th class by the Ottoman Empire on 5 October 1855. He was advanced to the position of officer in the Legion of Honour on 15 November 1856, by which time he held the rank of chef d'escadron in his regiment. Mouton reached the rank of colonel before his retirement in 1865. He died at Algiers on 9 November 1876. Mouton maintained a collection of Sikh art, which now forms part of the Toor Collection.
