= Sikh Khalsa Army =

Sikh Khalsa Army ਸਿੱਖ ਖ਼ਾਲਸਾ ਫੌਜ
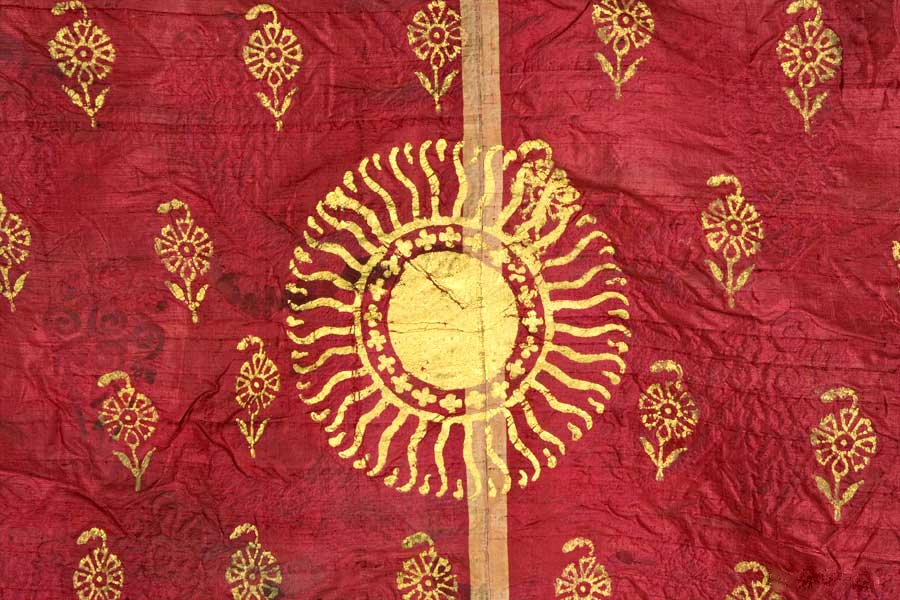
- Captured Sikh battle standard of First Anglo-Sikh War
- Active: 1790–1849
- Country: Sikh Empire
- Allegiance: Khalsa
- Size: at its greatest height, during 1838–39, before the death of Maharaja Ranjit Singh of Punjab; 120,000 men: • 5,500 Fauj-i-Khas elites • 60,000 Fauj-i-Ain regulars • 50,000 Fauj-i-Be Qawaid irregulars (consisting of Jagirdari levies, Fauj-i-Kilajat and Ghorcharas)
- Headquarters: Lahore, Attock, Kangra, Multan, Peshawar, Srinagar, Sirhind, Lohgarh,Bannu Phillaur
- Patron: The Maharajas of Punjab: Ranjit Singh; Kharak Singh; Nau Nihal Singh; Sher Singh; Duleep Singh
- Mottos: Deg Tegh Fateh (Cauldron, Sword, Victory or Prosperity in Peace and Victory in War)
- War Cry: Bole So Nihal, Sat Sri Akal (Whoever utters it shall be fulfilled, God is Eternal) Waheguru ji ka Khalsa Waheguru ji Ki Fateh (The Khalsa belongs to god, God will be victorious)
- March: Ranjeet Niagara, Gurbani Kirtan
- Anniversaries: Vaisakhi, Bandi Chhor Divas, Gurpurb, Holla Mohalla,
- Official Salutation: Waheguru Ji Ka Khalsa Waheguru Ji Ki Fateh (Khalsa Belongs to God's, Victory belongs to God) is normal but other regiments may vary
- Wars: Afghan-Sikh Wars; Nepal-Sikh War; Sino-Sikh War; First Anglo-Sikh War; Second Anglo-Sikh War
- Decorations: Bright Star of Punjab, Guru Jee ki sher, Fateh-o Nusrat Nasib, Zafar Jhang
- Battle honours: Lahore, Amritsar, Gujrat, Dera Ghazi Khan, Dera Ismail Khan, Attock, Multan, Shopian, Nowshera, Peshawar, Ladakh

Commanders
- Notable commanders: Ranjit Singh; Raja Fateh Singh; Hari Singh; Misr Chand; Dewan Chand; Sham Singh; Jean-Francois Allard; Jean-Baptiste Ventura; Akali Singh

Insignia
- Identification symbol: Hindu regiments: Various goddesses and gods Muslim regiments: crescent or others Sikh regiments: Khanda or plain banners Akalis: Katar, dhal, kirpan or aad chand
- Predecessor: Dal Khalsa
- Successor: Presidency armies

The Sikh Khalsa Army (Punjabi: ਸਿੱਖ ਖ਼ਾਲਸਾ ਫੌਜ, romanized: Sikha khālasā phauja), also known as Khalsaji, or simply Sikh Army, was the military force of the Sikh Empire. With its roots in the Khalsa founded by Guru Gobind Singh, the army was later modernised on Franco-British principles by Maharaja Ranjit Singh. It was divided in three wings: the Fauj-i-Khas (elites), Fauj-i-Ain (regular force) and Fauj-i-Be Qawaid (irregulars). Due to the lifelong efforts of the Maharaja and his European officers, it gradually became a prominent fighting force of Asia. Ranjit Singh changed and improved the training and organisation of his army. He reorganized responsibility and set performance standards in logistical efficiency in troop deployment, manoeuvre, and marksmanship. He reformed the staffing to emphasize steady fire over cavalry and guerrilla warfare, improved the equipment and methods of war. The military system of Ranjit Singh combined the best of both old and new ideas. He strengthened the infantry and the artillery. He paid the members of the standing army from treasury, instead of the Mughal method of paying an army with local feudal levies.

== Background ==
Before the reign of Ranjit Singh, the armies in Punjab consisted purely of cavalry. After Ranjit Singh became the Sardar of Sukerchakia Misl he gradually unified most of the Punjab through conquests and diplomacy. However the Afghans, the British and the Gurkhas remained a threat while his empire was in its infancy. Therefore, in 1805, he began recruiting regular forces and employing deserters from the East India Company as officers or soldiers. This latter tactic did not work particularly well because most of the deserters were constantly in touch with the British. The British were alarmed with the rapid conquests of Ranjit Singh and sent many diplomatic missions to help the Phulkian sardars from a possible conquest of their lands and to check the growing power of the Sikh sovereign. The Sikhs under Maharaja Ranjit Singh had already defeated the British while they first tried to lay claim to Delhi for the first time, states Rattan Singh Bhangu.

A Muslim regiment under Charles Metcalfe, 1st Baron Metcalfe was sent to Amritsar for talks with the Maharaja. The soldiers created noise through their chants as they approached Ranjit Singh's fort in Amritsar and passed near the Golden Temple and caused an irregular detachment of Nihang guards to inquire about the disturbances during prayer, before they were challenged by the Muslim soldiers who fired upon them. The Sikh Nihangs shot off many musket and matchlock volleys rather than a sword charge. It resulted in the death of many of Metcalfe's escorts, while others were wounded. Although more of Metcalfe's soldiers died, Ranjit Singh became particularly fascinated by the Muslim guards. This impressed Ranjit Singh and left a deep impact on him, as the Nihangs had quickly adopted the line formations of Metcalfe's escorts, dominating the entire Muslim battalion. The Maharaja then accepted the Treaty of Amritsar (1809), and saw the British as allies for the moment as he took the British refusal to engage after the assault on Metcalfe's convoy as well as the Sikh army's frequent unanswered incursions and attacks south of the Sutlej on British army officers in Ludhiana as signs of weakness on the part of the British.

== Fauj-i-Be Qawaid (Irregular Division) ==
=== Jagirdari Fauj ===
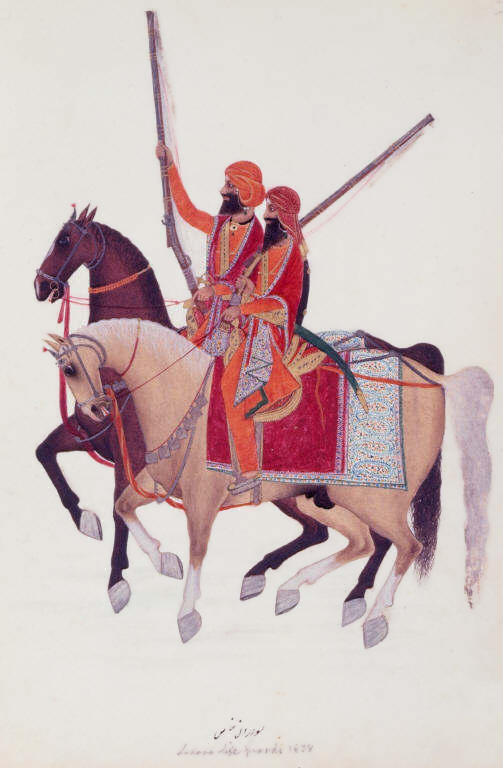
Ghorchara (Horse-mounted) Bodyguards of Maharaja Ranjit Singh of Punjab.

The regular military force was backed up and supported by a further 52,000 well-trained and equipped professional-grade irregulars, known as Fauj-i-Be Qawaid. In addition, a large reservoir of feudal and militia forces was available. Military jagirs were given to the ex-rulers of Misls. They in turn had to give tax to the state or a significant number of soldiers, known as Jagirdari Fauj. It consisted mostly of cavalry and infantry. It was the weakest part of the army.

=== Ghorcharas ===
Another part of the Irregular force were the Ghorcharas. Ghorcharas were the relatives of the nobles of the Sikh Empire and the police of the forts. They also refused any type of training and usually taunted the Europeans. The Ghorcharas or the irregular cavalry had no uniform laid down for them; yet they turned out sharply, as testified by Baron Hugel, a Prussian noble, who visited Maharajah Ranjit Singh in 1836 and inspected a cavalry parade. "I never beheld," he wrote of a troop of Ghorcharhas, "a finer nor a more remarkably striking body of men. Each one was dressed differently, and yet so much in the same fashion that they all looked in perfect keeping."<

=== Fauj-i-Kilajat ===
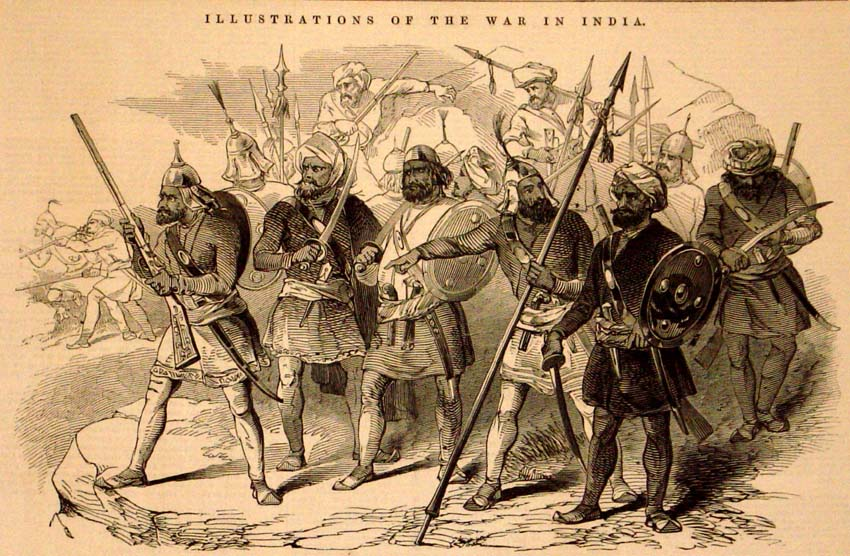
Fauj-i-Kilajat soldiers

The Fauj-i-Kilajat was the army defending the forts and also acting as police. Each fort had 50 to 250 of these men and their officer was called Killedar or Thanedar. They were mainly Muslims and wore a traditional white turban with a sky blue overcoat and a yellow kurta.

=== Misaldars ===
Misldar Sowars were part of the Ghorcharas.

Some small Misldars still kept their lands but under the Empire of Maharaja Ranjit Singh. One famous Misldar is Fateh Singh Ahluwalia who fought against the Afghan forces and did not agree to the Dogra supremacy.

== Akali Nihang Army ==
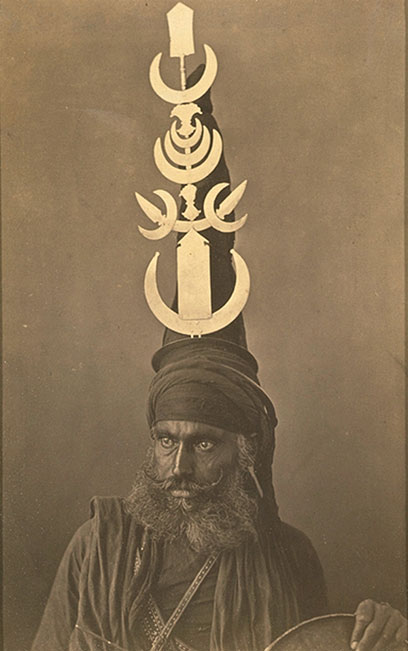
A Bungah-Wala Nihang with Gajgah

Akali Nihangs were not sustained under the Sikh Khalsa army. They were and are a religious army and follow their Jathedar as their emperor. These jathedars have evolved into the jathedars today. The Akali Nihangs even used to fight with the other armed soldiers of Maharaja Ranjit Singh. Other parts of the Irregulars consisted of the Akalis, also known as Nihangs. They were devout Sikhs, heavily armed with many traditional weapons and refused European style training. They only wore blue or yellow robes. Their leaders were Akali Phula Singh and Akali Sadhu Singh. Unlike today's Nihang sects and Jathas earlier all Nihangs were in the Budha Dal and ate meat. The Nihangs who hunted boars and deer kept the trophies as 'Soor Das' (Boar's Tooth) and 'Barha Singha' (Deer Horns).

=== Bunga-wali Nihang ===
The Nihang Bana started with a navy or surmayee blue four foot tall Dastar Bunga with many chakrams in ascending order and a Gajgah. On the top of the turban lied a metre and a half long pharla to show that the spirit of the Khalsa would never be broken. Under the dastar Bunga was a Surmayee or navy chola with a yellow hazooria and kamar kasa. Under the Kamar Kasa (a cotton belt) should be two Kirpans, a khanda and other daggers. One Kirpan should be Nagini and one straight. All Nihangs had horses on which there would be a Nishan Sahib, long Musket, a Karpa Barcha and a Nagni Barcha. The Nishan Sahib should be pointed up resembling victory and should have an Ashtabhuja Dhuja on top. This class of Nihangs always came at the Back of the army as they had the tallest turban and held the Nishan Sahib. They were known as the troops of Baba Fateh Singh which inspired the war-cry Fateh Singh Ke Jathe Singh.

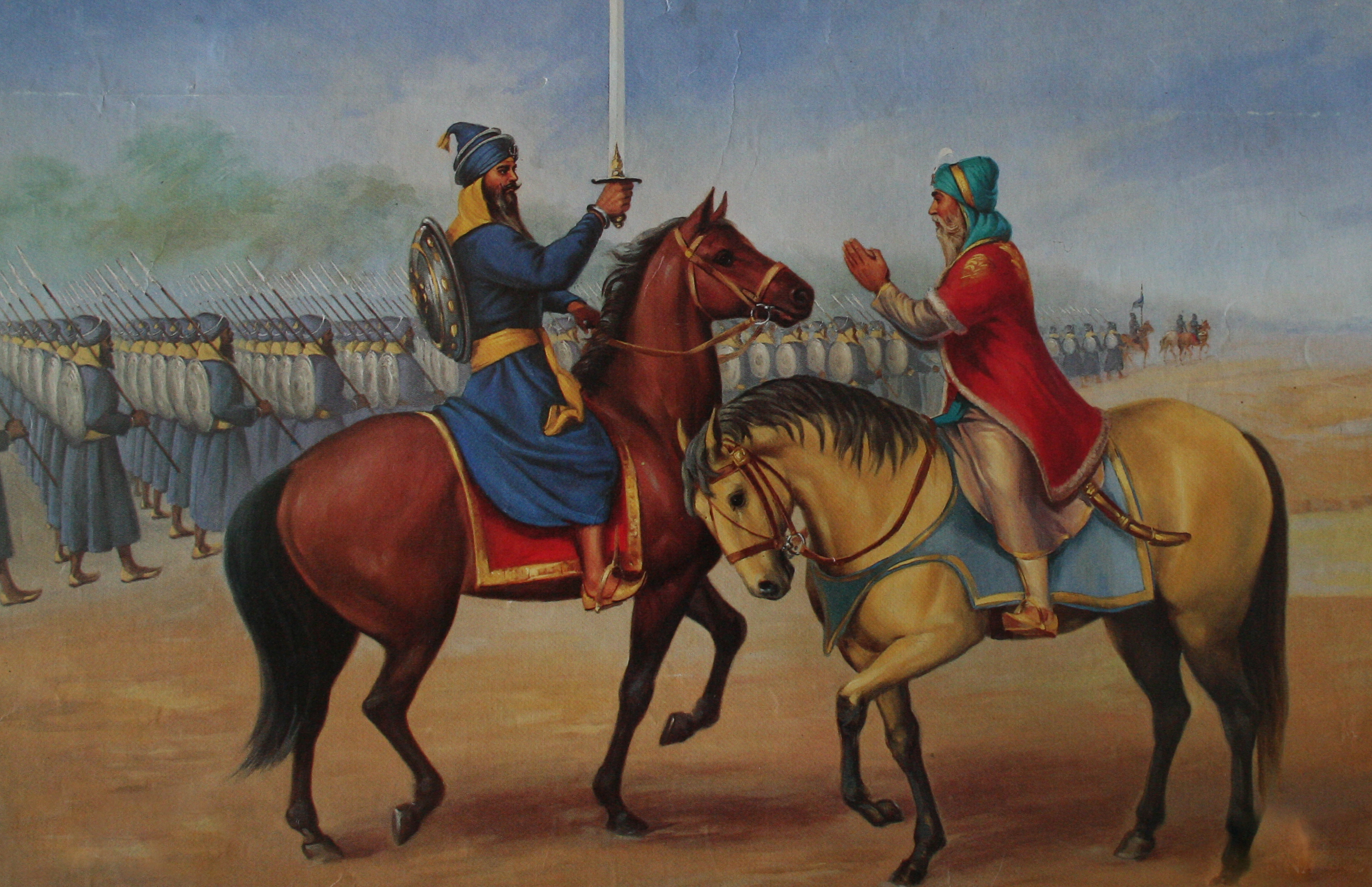
Akali Phula Singh in Dumala-Wala Nihang uniform.

=== Dumala-Wali Nihang ===
The Dumala-Wala Nihangs wore a shorter turban with three to four chakrams and a small pharla from it. In the turban lied three to four short Khandas. On the Nihangs back has to be a Dhal with a Vadda Chakram below and on the shoulders was a yellow hazooria. They also carried a Katar tucked in their Kamar-Kasa with two Kirpans, a Khanda, a Jamdhardh and a Toradar Matchlock. They held a Nagni Barcha on their back in a holder. Most of them were cavalry while some were archers and infantry.

== Modernisation and Formation of Regular Corps ==
Throughout 1805, Ranjit Singh recruited many East India Company deserters in his army. The early results were unimpressive. During the visit of Charles Metcalfe, he was shown a band of soldiers, most of them wearing traditional kurtas and colourful turbans, while others wore European infantry ornaments. They had either traditional matchlock or European muskets.

Previously, as the Sikhs refused to join infantry service, Pashtuns, Pakhtuns and Gurkhas served in this sector of the army. However, with the passage of time and owing to Ranjit Singh's efforts, Sikhs too began to join the infantry in large numbers. In 1822 Ranjit Singh employed a veteran of the Napoleonic Wars, General Jean-Baptiste Ventura to train the infantry in European style. In a few years, under his command, the infantry was modernized in French pattern. Similarly, in 1822, Ranjit Singh employed another French Napoleonic War veteran, General Jean-François Allard to modernize the Sikh cavalry. In 1827 Claude Auguste Court, and in 1832 Colonel Alexander Gardner was employed to modernise the artillery.

Ranjit Singh wanted to westernise his army. The military system that he had inherited from his forefathers also served him well. The military system of the Sikh Empire under Ranjit Singh finally evolved as a compromise between the old and the new. Thus, the military system of the Sikh Empire is termed as a Franco-British system in the Indian subcontinent.

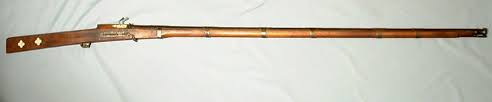
Sikh Matchlock musket, known as toradar.

== Fauj-i-Ain (Regular Division) ==
Following the Battle of Nowshera in 1823, Maharaja Ranjit Singh formally divided the trained section of the Khalsaji, the Fauj-i-Ain, into two unequal divisions: the Kampu-i-mu'alla and the Fauj-i-Khas, the former being the larger segment.

=== Infantry ===
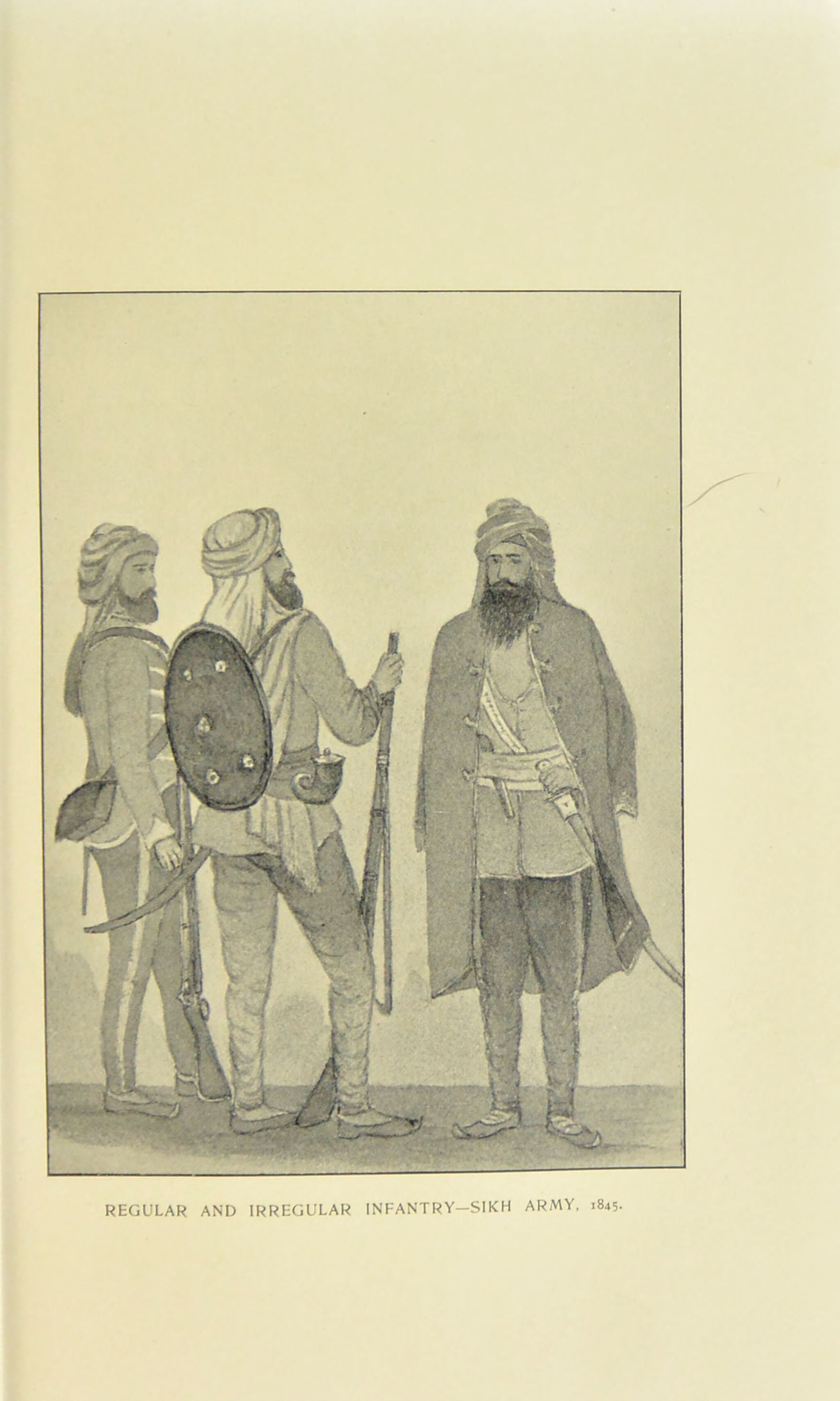
Illustration titled 'Regular and irregular infantry–Sikh army, 1845'

Ranjit Singh was fully aware of the importance of infantry. The task of recruitment in this section of the army had started after 1805, and continued throughout his reign. In the beginning, the number of Sikhs enrolled in the infantry was nominal. The reason being that the Sikhs looked down upon infantry. Therefore, in the beginning, Ranjit Singh recruited Pathans and Dogras in this section of his army. Afterwards, owing to Ranjit Singh's efforts, Sikhs too began to join it. In 1822, he employed General Jean-Baptiste Ventura to train the infantry in western pattern. Under his guidance, within a few years, the infantry became the most disciplined unit of the Sikh army.

By 1838-1839 the strength of the infantry had risen to 45,000. It was divided into battalions, companies and sections. Each battalion consisted of 800 soldiers. It was put under a Commandant. Each battalion was divided into eight companies. Each company was put under a Subedar. Each company was divided into 4 sections. Each section consisted of 25 soldiers. It was put under a Jamadar.

=== Cavalry ===
The second most important division of the army was cavalry. In order to organize it on western lines, Ranjit Singh appointed General Jean-Francois Allard. Under his command, the cavalry became very strong. In 1838–39, the overall strength of the cavalry was 10,000. The cavalry was divided into regiments. Each regiment consisted of 250 to 600 cavaliers. The regiments were further divided into risalas (corps). Each Risala consisted of 150 to 250 cavaliers. The officers and other non-combatants of cavalry were similar to those of infantry. The pay of the cavalry was, however, higher than that of the infantry. The men in this division had a sort of helmet-turban with igret feathers coming out from the tip, they clad themselves in yellow kurtas and grey pajamas.

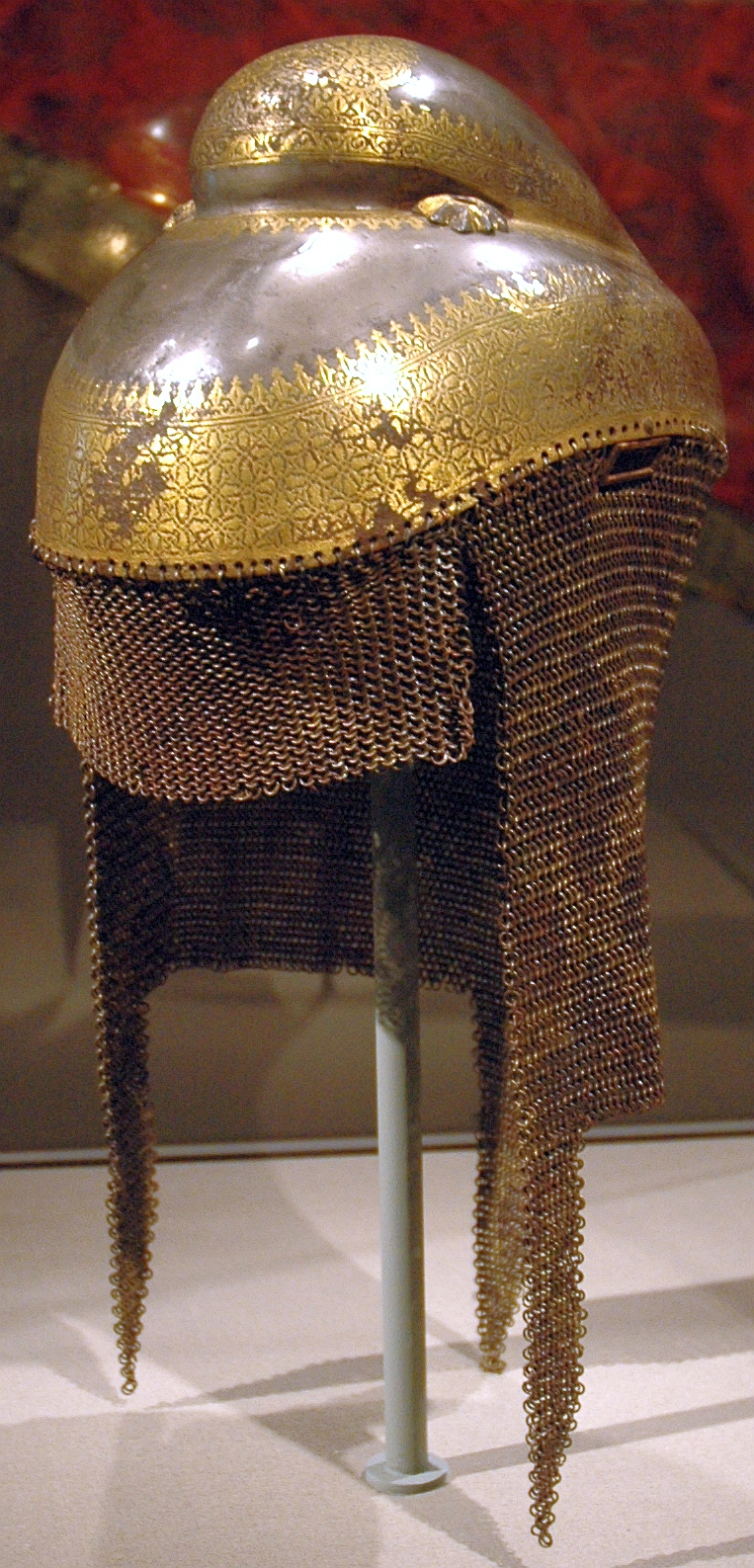
Sikh cavalry turban helmet

=== Artillery ===
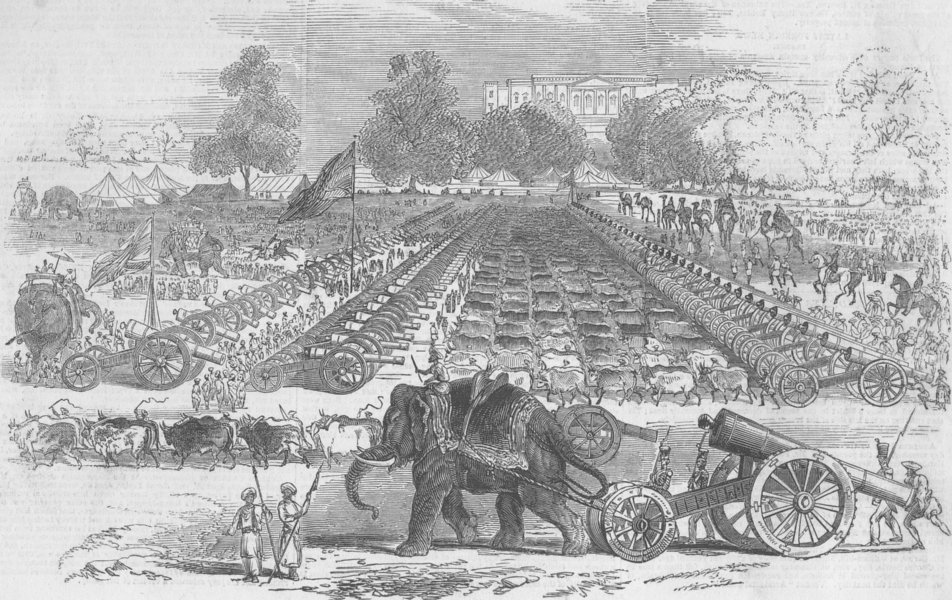
"The Sikh trophy guns 'forming up', in the fort of Monghyr," from the Illustrated London News, 1847

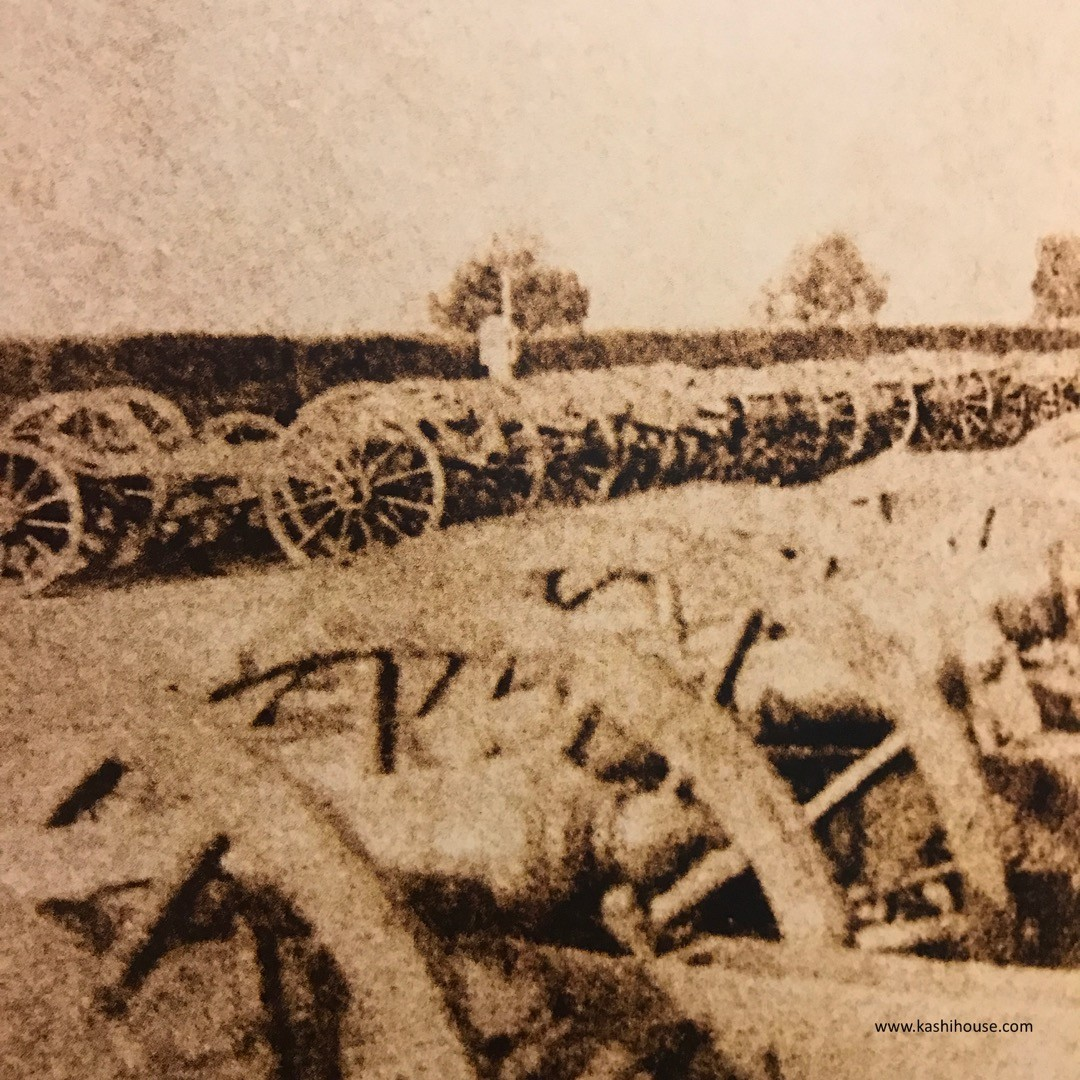
Captured Sikh guns of the Sikh Empire parked in Ambala Cantonment in the aftermath of the Second Anglo-Sikh War, calotype or daguerreotype by John McCosh, circa April 1849.

Ranjit Singh was fully aware of the importance of artillery in the modern warfare. Therefore, he paid a special attention to the development of artillery in 1810. In 1812 he employed General Claude Auguste Court and Colonel Alexander Gardner in 1832 and organized Topkhana-i-Khas. Under their able guidance the artillery made matchless progress in a few years. Maharaja Ranjit Singh divided his artillery into four categories:

- Topkhana-i-Fili: Heavy cannons pulled by elephants
- Topkhana-i-Shutri consisted of those guns which were pulled by camels.
- Topkhana-i-Aspi consisted of light guns pulled by horses
- Topkhana-i-Gavi consisted of medium cannons pulled by oxen

The artillery was divided into batteries or deras. Each battery consisted of 10 guns and 250 gunners. Each battery was under a commandant. The batteries were further divided into sections. Each section compromised 2 guns and 8 to 10 gunners. Each section was under a Jamadar. The entire artillery was under a General. In 1838-39, the strength of the Sikh artillery was 182 heavy cannons, 20 howitzers, and 60 light cannons. It had at least 5,000 gunners.

== Fauj-i-Khas (French Division) ==
=== Infantry ===
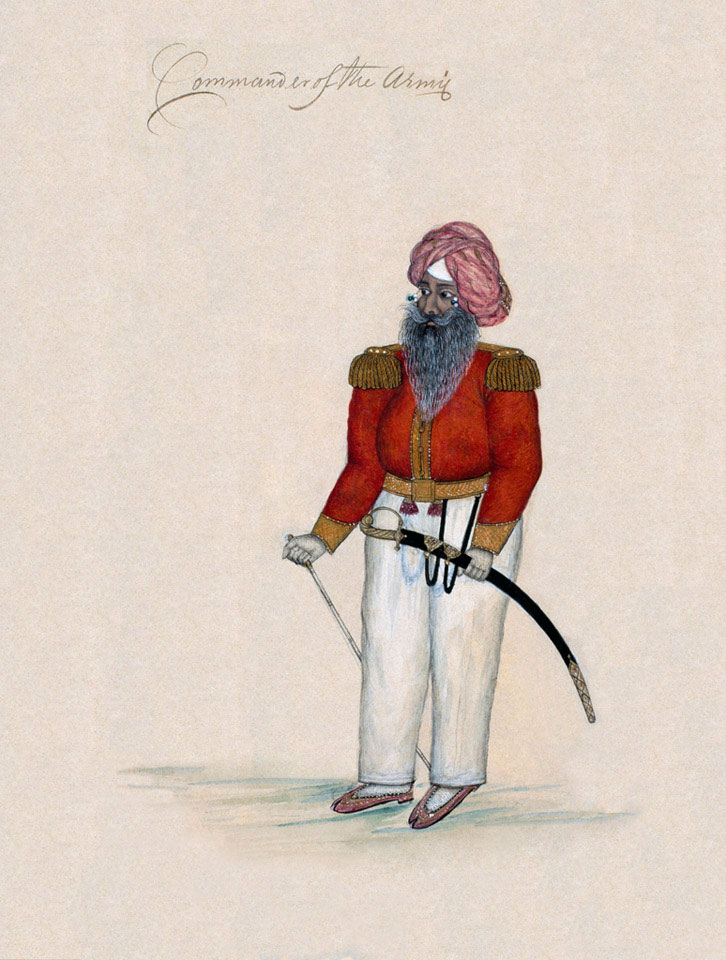
Commander of a Sikh Army, 1850. Watercolour on Oriental paper.

The Fauj-i-Khas was the elite wing of the Fauj-i-Ain. It was strictly trained under French pattern and had a separate emblem and flag. It consisted of four infantry battalions, two cavalry regiments and one artillery troop. Its weapons and equipment (including clothing) was of the best kind. The Fauj-i-Khas was supplied with the best available ammunition and they were very loyal to Ranjit Singh, whom they usually escorted. The banner was of a French style and usually had its tricolor with 'Waheguru' inscribed on it. Infantry was clad in scarlet jacket/coat, white trousers with black belts and pouches. Different regiments were distinguished by the colour of their headdress white, red, green or yellow. The Gurkhas had green jackets and black caps. Postins (furcoats), or padded jackets were used during winter. Pathans and Mazhabis were directly sent to this force.

=== Cavalry ===
Cavalrymen were dressed in red jackets (French grey for lancers), long blue trousers with a red stripe, and crimson turbans. Woollen jackets were used during winter. They all instead of the traditional weapons carried only a three-foot kirpan and a lance. The regiments were armed with varying combinations of weapons, including swords/sabres, carbines, matchlocks, and lances.

=== Artillery ===
One of the most unique regiments of the Sikh Khalsa Army was the Shutersawaar or the cannon mounted war camel used by Hari Singh Nalwa in his conquest of Peshawar. The Shutersawaar was in the Sher-Dil-Rajman Regiment. Gunners wore white trousers and black waistcoats with crossbelts. Officers were not bound by rules of uniform. They used distinctive dress of bright coloured silks each picking his own as he saw fit.

== Amazonian corps ==
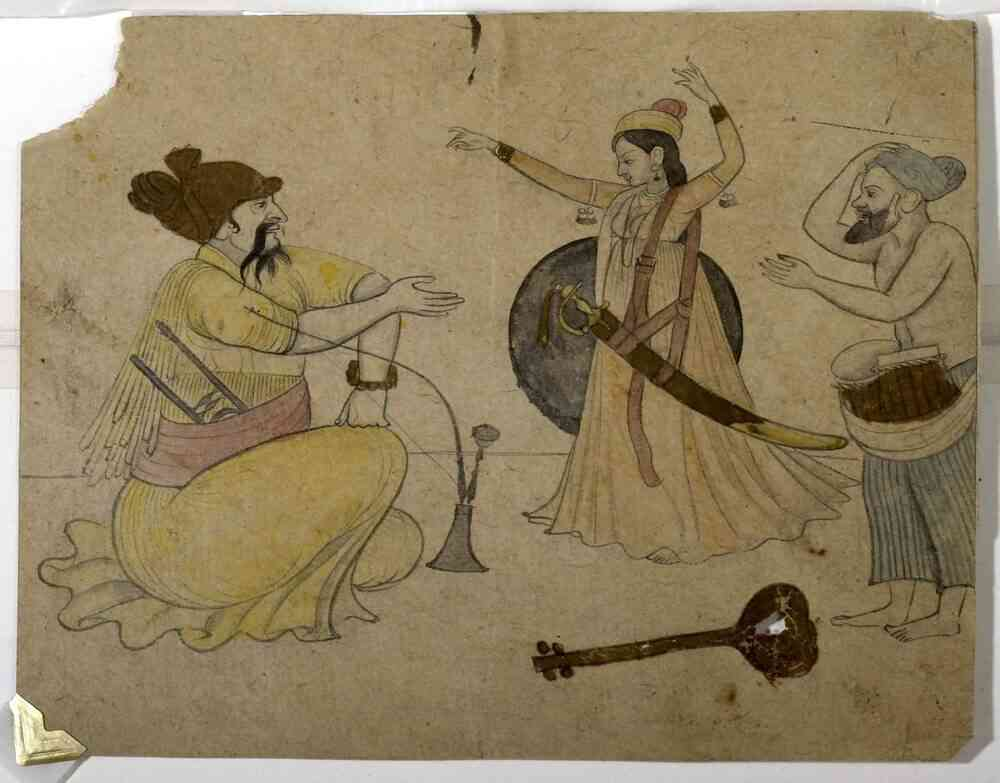
'A Man with a Huqqah (smoking pipe) and Dancing Girl or The Amazons of Ranjit Singh' by an unknown artist, ca.1840–50, Lahore Museum.

There existed an amazonian corps composed of women, named after the ancient Greek legend of a nation of fighting women by visiting European officials. There is no evidence they partook in any actual fighting. They performed martial dances with swords for visiting foreign dignitaries. Whilst dancing, they wore men's clothing. Their dances symbolized the martial glory of the Sikh Empire and its sovereignty.

The earliest surviving mention of the amazonian corps is from 12 March 1831:

...A royal order was issued to all the dancing girls in the town of Lahore to put on male garments, hold swords and bows in their hands and be decorated with other arms as well and then to present themselves at the Deorhi of the Maharaja on elephants and horses, in perfect smartness and with great grace...

— Victor Jacquemon, visiting French naturalist

Another contemporary observation of the corps was made by the Scottish traveler and explorer, Alexander Burne, in his travelogue:

On our arrival, we found... a party of thirty or forty dancing girls, dressed uniformly in boys’ clothes. They were mostly natives of Cashmere or the adjacent mountains... (and) their figures and features were small, and their Don Giovanni costume of flowing silk most becoming, improved as it was by a small bow and quiver in the hand of each. ‘This,’ said Runjeet Sing, ‘is one of my regiments (pultuns), but they tell me it is one I cannot discipline’—a remark which amused us, and mightily pleased the fair.

— Alexander Burne

The amazons may have served as a mock bodyguard troupe for the Sikh ruler. They were feared and respected. The commander of the amazonian corps was a singer named Billo.

=== Uniform ===
The uniform of the amazonians of the Sikh court were described as follows:

Their uniform was as follows: a lemon yellow Banarsi turban with a bejewelled crest; a dark green jumper over a blue satin gown, fastened with a gold belt; deep crimson skin tight pyjamas of Gulbadan; silk and a pair of golden shoes. As for jewellery, they wore a pair of gold earrings set with stones, a diamond nose stud, a pair of golden bracelets and a ruby ring on the middle finger.

— Faqir Waheed ul Din, The Real Ranjit Singh

== Composition ==
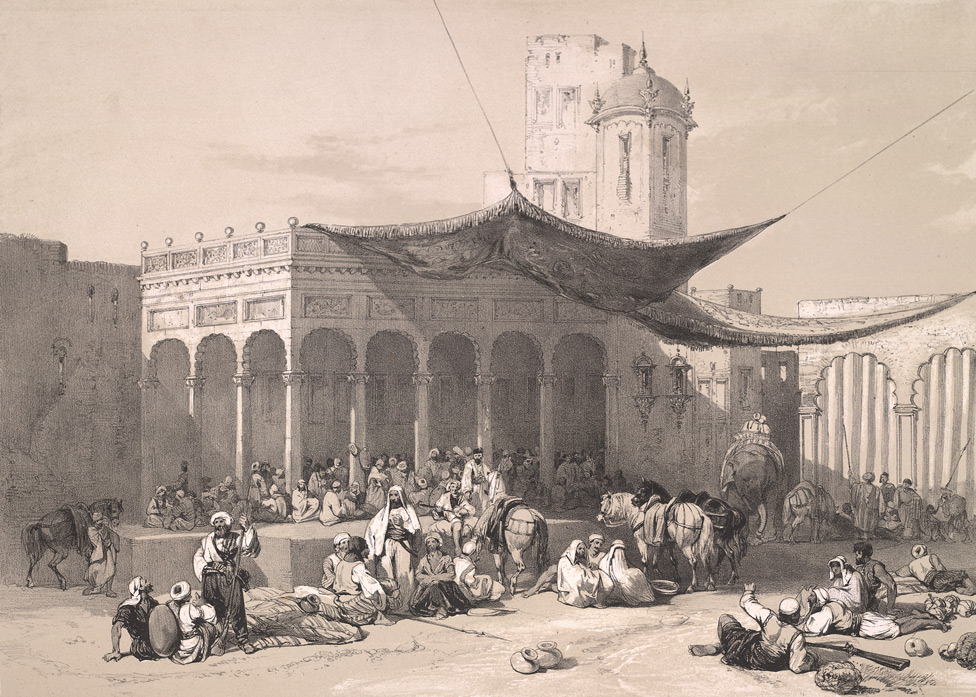
Sikh soldiers receiving their pay at the Royal Durbar.

Sikhs formed the bulk of the Sikh Empire's army. The Sikh Army was mainly Punjabi with a predominantly Sikh cadre, but also had a significant multi-religious component made up from other parts of the Punjabi people. There were soldiers of different religious backgrounds (i.e. Muslims and Hindus) and there were soldiers of different tribal backgrounds: Pashtuns, Dogras, Khatris, Mohyal Brahmans, Jats, Kashyap Rajputs, Ramgarhias, Nepalis and European mercenaries. A promotion to a higher military rank was based on military skill, not hereditary background, so the Sikh Khalsa Army was a classic meritocracy. Enlistment in the army was entirely voluntary, and only strong, physically fit men were recruited. The task of recruiting officers was in the hands of the Generals or the Maharaja himself. Every year, a lot of money was spent on presents and honours for the soldiers who had displayed gallantry. Titles like "Fateh-o Nusrat Nasib", "Zafar Jhang" and "Bright Star of Punjab" were given to many Generals. For disloyalty a soldier could be imprisoned or exiled. Usually, the soldiers were granted two months of leave, either in the winter season or before it. When soldiers were required, leaves were cancelled and they were granted leave at the end of the campaign. The pay of the Sikh Khalsa Army was higher than the pay of the British East India Company and other Asian armies.

Fauj-i-Khas infantry standard

== Emblems and banners ==
The Nishan Sahib Sikh flag flew throughout the empire. The Nihangs had the Blue Flag, while different regiments of the army from different religions were allowed to have banners of their own. The regular regiments of different Sikh sardars had mostly blue-coloured flags and banners. The infantry regiments had flags with depictions of plants and cavalry regiments had depictions of horses on their flags. The Fauj-i-Khas had its own French tricolore flag with Waheguru on it. Most of the Sikh flags had the inscription of the motto of the Khalsa: "Deg Tegh Fateh", in Persian Nastaʿlīq script.

== Disbandment ==
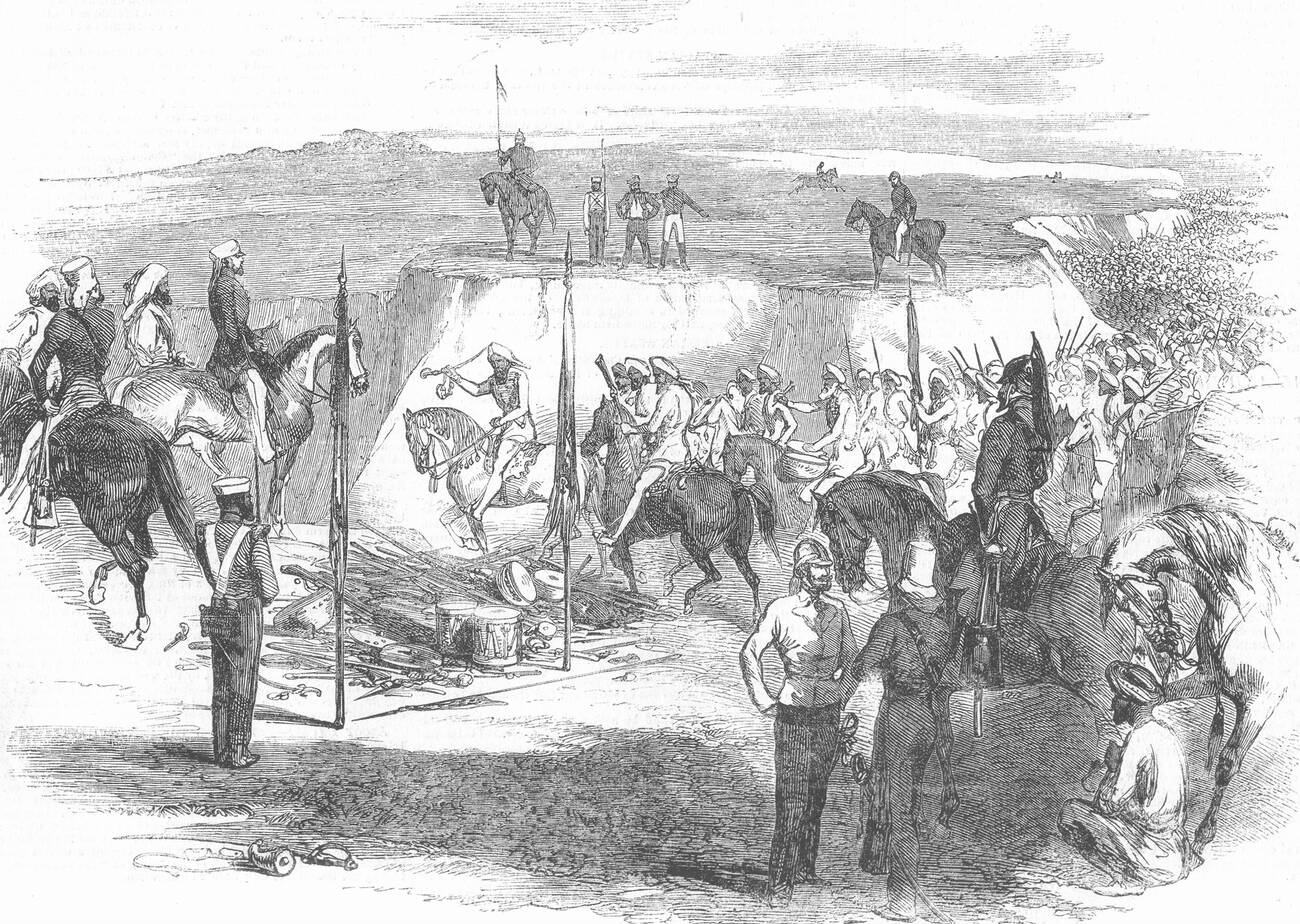
"The Sikh cavalry delivering up their arms at Rawul Pindee (Rawalpindi), March 14, 1849," from the Illustrated London News, 1849

After the death of Ranjit Singh, the Sikh Empire witnessed the murders of Ranjit Singh's sons, one after another, organised by the Dogras. Then the Dogras urged the army to make the Lahore Durbar declare war on the East India Company. They did so, and the Dogra-led Sikh Army was betrayed by its commanders who revealed battle plans to the British, which allowed them to win several crucial battles. This led to the defeat of the Khalsa and the British signed the Treaty of Lahore, ending the war in a Sikh defeat. The treaty stipulated that the Sikh Empire was to pay a significant amount of reparations to the East India Company, and Jind Kaur, the Sikh regent, was imprisoned and later exiled. The Sikh Army was reduced to 20,000 infantry and 10,000 cavalry. The disbanded soldiers were also furious with the terms of the treaty. This led to the Second Anglo-Sikh War, in which the Sikhs won many battles, but finally lost the Battle of Gujrat. On 10 March 1848 Sikh leaders Chattar Singh Attariwalla and Sher Singh Attariwalla eventually surrendered near Rawalpindi. On 14 March 1849, the Sikh Army surrendered to the East India Company. Many soldiers, while laying their weapons down, started crying and saying "Aj Ranjit Singh mar Gaya" (literally "Today Ranjit Singh has died"). However, many Sikh Army soldiers entered into service the British Indian Army, where they served with distinction in numerous battles and wars under the British Crown.

Within six-weeks of the new British administration, the old Sikh Army was disbanded and 120,000 weapons (from matchlocks to daggers) were confiscated. A muster was held at Lahore, with 50,000 former Sikh soldiers being paid and disbanded. All former military establishments throughout the region, except those valued by the new British administration, were dismantled.

== Ranks of the Sikh Khalsa Army ==
Ranjit Singh encircled himself with an array of generals and soldiers. They were men from different clans, castes and regions. Some of the ranks come from English, like adjudan (adjutant), kalnal (colonel), jarnail (general).

Sikh Khalsa Army rank	Modern USA/UK/NATO equivalent
Kumedan or Jarnail	Major General
Sardar	Brigadier General
Adjudan-kumedan	Staff Colonel
Kalnal	Colonel
Kalnal-i-Sahni	Senior lieutenant colonel
Jamadar Kalnal	Lieutenant Colonel
Mahzor-i-Sahni	Senior Major
Mahzor	Major
Kaptan	Staff Captain
Subedar	Captain
Jamadar	First Lieutenant
Jamadar-i-Sahni	Second Lieutenant
Non-commissioned officers
Adjudan Safis	Chief Warrant Officer
Adjudan-Seph	Warrant Officer
Adjudan or Sarjan	Sergeant-Major
Sarjan Mahzor	First sergeant
Havildar	Sergeant
Muttasadi or Phuriya	Company clerk/supply Sergeant
Naik or Brigadier (Cavalry, Horse Artillery and Gendarmerie)	Corporal
Sepoy or Sowar (Cavalry) or Topchi(Artillery)	Private or UK equivalent

== Notable generals ==
Among some of the most important and illustrious names include:

- Hari Singh Nalwa
- Mahan Singh Mirpuri
- Misr Diwan Chand
- Dewan Mokham Chand
- Gulab Singh Dogra
- Dhian Singh Dogra
- Akali Phula Singh
- Fateh Singh Ahluwalia
- Jodh Singh Ramgarhia
- Ghaus Mohammad Khan
- Khushal Singh Jamadar
- Raja Teja Singh
- Veer Singh
- Sawan Mal
- Nihal Singh Attariwalla
- Sher Singh
- Zorawar Singh
- Chattar Singh Attariwalla
- Balbhadra Kunwar

Among his European Mercenary Generals were:

- Jean-Baptiste Ventura - Italian (Modena)
- Jean-François Allard - French
- Paolo di Avitabile - Italian (Naples)
- Claude Court - French
- François Henri Mouton - French
- Alexander Gardner
- Josiah Harlan - American general and later governor of Gujrat
- Henry Stienbach - Prussian Ashkenazi Jew
- General Faulks
- Henry Charles Van Courtland

== See also ==
- Sant Sipahi
- Miri piri
- Gatka
- Shastar Vidya
- Degh Tegh Fateh
- Dharamyudh
- Fauj-i-Khas
- Misl
- Maharaja Ranjit Singh's Generals
- Sikh Confederacy
- Fauj-i-Ain
- Ranjit Singh
- History of the Punjab
- Akal Sena
