= Toradar =

Indian rifle

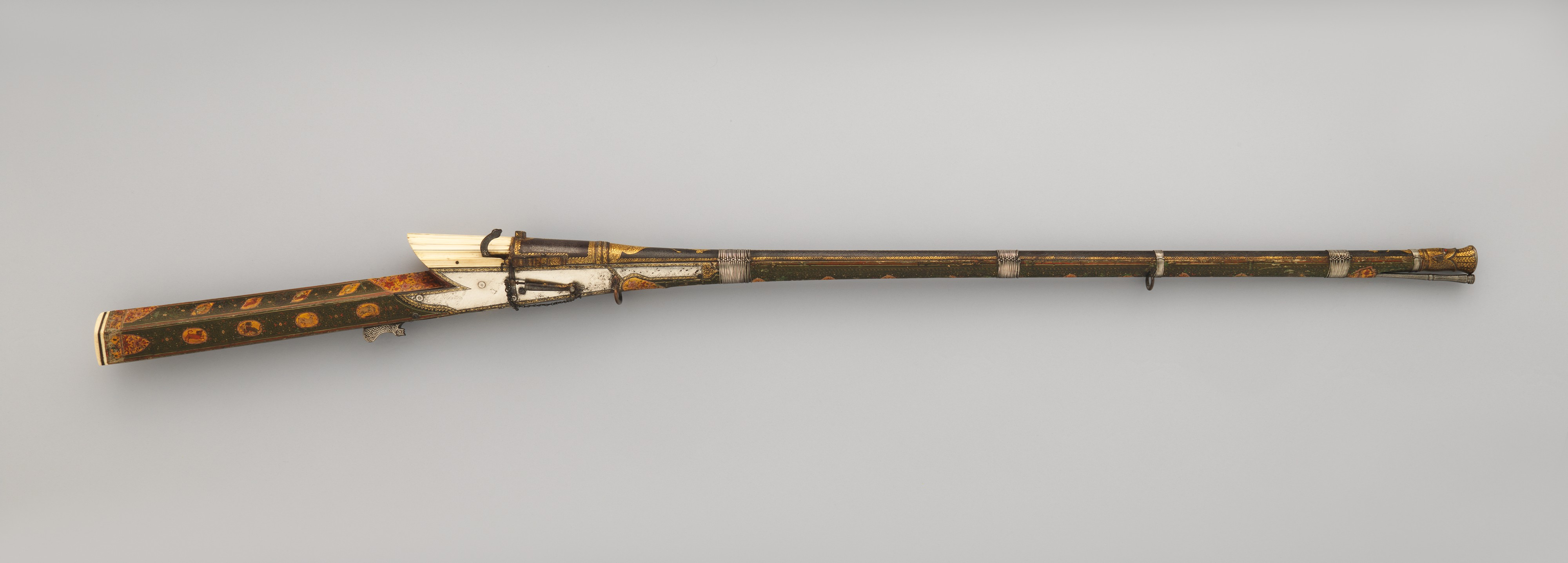
This toradar is probably used for hunting. The decoration on the stock shows various animal figures e.g. buffaloes, panthers, etc.

A toradar (Hindi: तोरादार, Persian: تورادار, Punjabi: ਤੋਰਾਦਾਰ) is a Indian matchlock primarily found in the Mughal Empire and Mysore dating from the 16th century. It was a preferred firearm in India well until the mid-19th century because of its economical and simple design.

== History ==
When the Portuguese reached India in 1498, they brought with them firearms, among them the matchlock musket. However, expert armorers were already plentiful in India, and native craftsmen began to copy the weapons and adapting them for their own needs. Most of these craftsmen started to apply a style of decoration that normally would be applied to their traditional weapon. Soon a distinctive local style evolved, and the toradar was invented in the Indian subcontinent.

Toradar matchlock remained to be the preferred firearms mechanism well until about 1830. Part of the reason why the matchlocks were still more popular than the wheellocks and flintlocks was because the matchlocks were easier and cheaper to produce. Toradar was sometimes used as a hunting gun.

== Description ==
A toradar is basically an Indian matchlock. They were found mostly in the Mughal-influenced Northern and Central India. Two types of toradar exist: one has a very slim, from 3 feet (91 cm) to 6 feet (180 cm) long, straight stock with pentagonal-shaped section, and a light barrel; the other type is always between 5 feet (150 cm) to 6 feet (180 cm) long, has a curved stock with diamond-shaped section and a very heavy barrel, much enlarged at the breech. Both have the regular Indian type of lock, which is covered with a pan cover that usually swings on a pin. The iron side plates which reinforce each side of the stock extend for some distance on each side of the lock.

The barrel is usually fastened to the stock by wire band or leather thongs which frequently pass over silver saddles on the barrel. The rear sight of the first type have ogival shape, or an open V, while the second usually has a very large open rear sight. Both types' muzzles are generally fastened with moulded ring. The front sight are made very long so as to show above them. This front sights were often shaped into figurative forms e.g. the nose of a man, or shaped like tiger's head. Some toradar have square-shaped barrel, even with square bores. Both types generally have a clevis for a sling strap and some have two.

Compared with the European matchlocks, the stock of a toradar has a more simple shape than the fish-tail shaped butt of the European matchlock. The stock is also too small to be placed against the shoulder, so the Indian toradar were normally held beneath the arm.

A toradar used for sporting gun had painting of hunting figures, e.g. birds, other animals, and landscapes.

== Artistic decoration and depiction ==
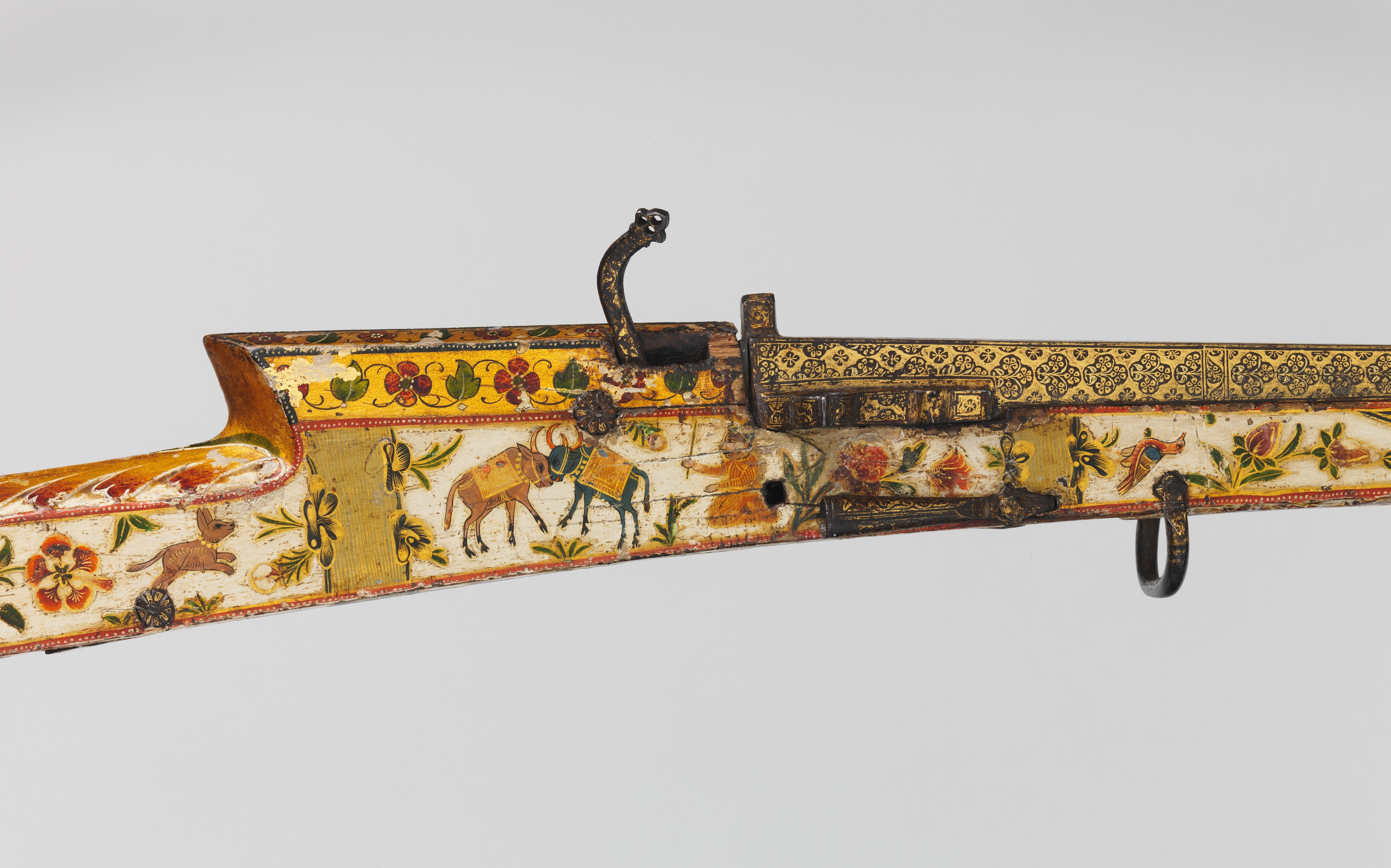
A Rajasthani Toradar with paintings of flowers.

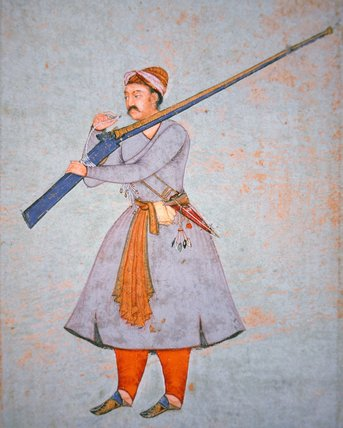
Officer of the Mughal Army with large Matchlock during Akbar's reign

Decoration of a toradar reflects the local culture where the toradar is created. For the toradar, craftsmen produced some very complex ornate art from ivory bone or precious metal inlays on the barrels and the stocks. 16th century paintings, especially in the paintings during Mughal emperor Akbar's time, depict a few soldiers using matchlocks. Akbar's reign saw the rise of the tufang. Up to the middle of the 18th century, the weapon was looked on with less favour than the bow and arrow. 17th century Mughal emperor Shah Jahan was depicted holding a matchlock with floral decoration. A toradar from 18th-century Mysore, in the southern Indian state of Karnataka is exquisitely decorated with incised flowers and foliage. The decorations are entirely gilded. The incised side plates are made of iron. Animal figures are thoroughly represented in the toradar; the match holder of toradar usually has a serpentine naga-like shape, figures of tiger are impressed in the trigger of the Mysore toradar. A 19th-century toradar from Narwar has a tiger's head shaped around the muzzle.

== See also ==
- Military history of India
- Gunpowder warfare
- History of gunpowder

== Cited works ==
- Blair, Claude (1979). Enciclopedia ragionata delle armi. Milano: Arnoldo Mondadori Editore.
- Gahir, Sunita; Spencer, Sharon, eds. (2006). Weapon - A Visual History of Arms and Armor. New York City: DK Publishing. ISBN 9780756622107.
- Richards, J.F. (1995). The Mughal Empire. Cambridge University Press. ISBN 9780521566032.
- Stone, George Cameron (2013). A Glossary of the Construction, Decoration and Use of Arms and Armor: in All Countries and in All Times. Dover: Courier Corporation. ISBN 9780486131290.

=== Further reading ===
- Iqtidar Alam Khan. "Gunpowder and Firearms: Warfare in Medieval India". Oxford University Press, 2004.
- Jos Gommans. "Mughal Warfare: Indian Frontiers and Highroads to Empire, 1500–1700". Routledge, 2002.
