= Muhammad Mahfuz =

Pakistani soldier (1944–1971)

Lance Naik Muhammad Mahfuz NH
- Born: Mahfooz; 25 October 1944; Pind Malikan (now Mehfoozabad), Rawalpindi District, Punjab, British India
- Died: 18 December 1971 (aged 27); Wahga-Attari Sector
- Burial place: Mehfoozabad, Islamabad, Pakistan
- Military career
- Allegiance: Pakistan
- Branch: Pakistan Army
- Service years: 1962–1971
- Rank: Lance Naik
- Nickname: Boxer
- Units: 3/16th Punjab Regiment; 15 Punjab Regiment
- Conflicts: Indo-Pakistani War of 1965; Indo-Pakistani War of 1971 †
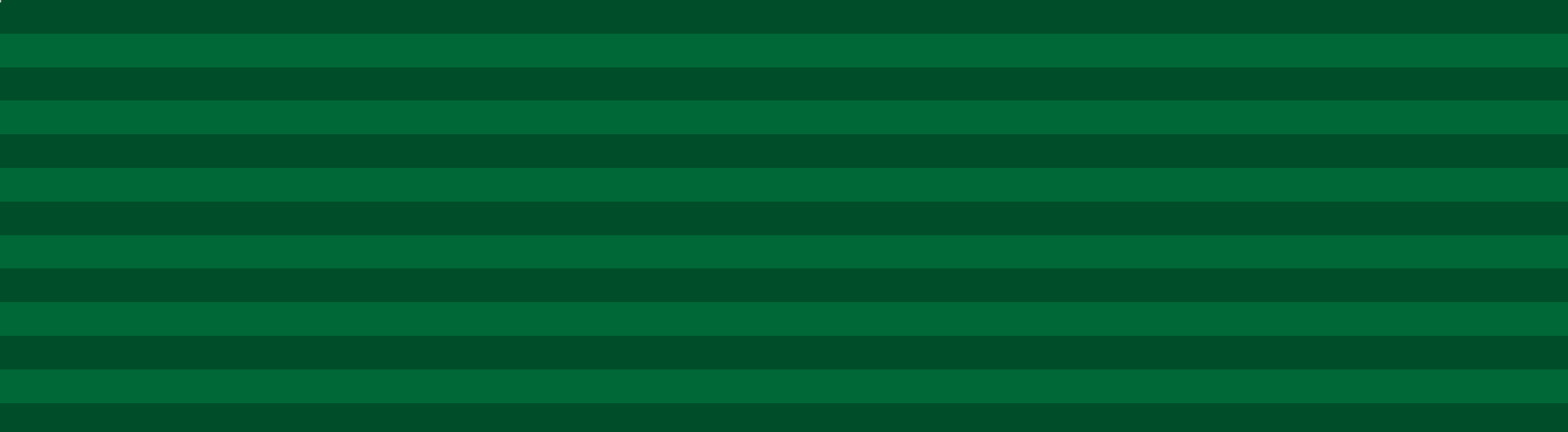
- Awards: Nishan-e-Haider

Naik Muhammad Mahfuz (born 25 October 1944 – 18 December 1971) was a Pakistani military soldier and the ninth recipient of Pakistan's highest military award, Nishan-e-Haider. He was posthumously awarded for his gallant and valorous actions during the Indo-Pakistani War of 1971.He was born in Qutab Shahi Awan family.

== Early life ==
Muhammad Mahfuz was born in Pind Malikan (now renamed Mahfuzabad in his honour) in Rawalpindi District, Punjab. He joined the Pakistan Army on 25 October 1962 as an infantry soldier.

== Nishan-e-Haider action ==
During the Indo-Pakistani War of 1971, a company of the 15th Punjab Regiment was under command of the 43 Punjab Regiment which was deployed in the Wagah-Attari sector along the Indian border. On 16 December 1971, Pakistan had signed instrument of surrender in Dhaka; while on 18 December 1971, during the attack on the enemy at Pul Kanjri post, his company was pinned down by enemy fire and his machine-gun was destroyed by an Indian shell. Company of 43 Punjab Regiment under the command of Major Subha Sadiq (also killed in the same battle), came for support and fought hard until the capture of the strategic town of Pul Kanjri. Even though Lance Naik Muhammad Mehfuz Shaheed, NH was wounded in his legs by shrapnel, he moved towards an enemy bunker, from whose gunfire had caused the death of many Pakistanis. Upon entering the bunker, he began strangling the enemy soldier who shot him, shortly after he was killed by another with a bayonet.

== Awards and decorations ==
Immediately after the war was over, the Indian Army recognized his bravery and said that if he were in the Indian Army, they would award him the Vir Chakra. On 23 March 1972, Mahfooz was posthumously awarded the Nishan-e-Haider, the highest gallantry award of Pakistan.
