= Order of the Propitious Star of Punjab =

- Insignia of a member of the order

Awarded by the House of Sandhawalia
- Type: Dynastic order
- Established: 1837
- Royal house: Sandhawalia
- Ribbon: Green; Red
- Motto: Deg Tegh Fateh
- Eligibility: Nobles, peers, rulers
- Criteria: Distinguished merits
- Status: Disbanded (Note: The Order was de-jure disbanded upon the Empire's disbandment)
- Founder: Ranjit Singh
- Last Sovereign: Duleep Singh
- Grades: Third Class; Second Class; First Class

Precedence
- Next (higher): Order of the Auspicious Star of Punjab
- Next (lower): Order of Guru Govind Singh

The Order of the Propitious Star of Punjab (Persian: کوکب اقبال پنجاب Kaukab-i Iqbal-i Punjab) was a dynastic order of knighthood of the Sikh Empire created in 1837 by Maharaja Ranjit Singh to commemorate the marriage of his grandson Nau Nihal Singh. It had three numbered grades, the order was conferred to various princes, peers, and even foreign soldiers. In addition to the three classes, an unofficial Grand Master class is also listed in some sources.

== Recipients ==
A full list of recipients is not currently available, the following is a list of notable recipients of the Order:

- Maharaja Ranjit Singh (by creation)
- Maharaja Duleep Singh (by descent)
- Maharajadhiraja Nawah Nihalah Bahadur (10 March 1837, Grand Master)
- Shahzada Taur Singh (October 3 1837, First class)
- Shahzada Multana Singh Bahadur (October 3 1837, First class)
- Shahzada Kashmira Singh Bahadur (October 3 1837, First class)
- Shahzada Peshawara Singh (October 3 1837, First class)
- Maharajadhiraja Khārakh Singh (October 3 1837, First class)
- Jean-Baptiste Ventura (date and class unknown)
- Jean-Francois Allard (date and class unknown)
