= Manveen Sandhu =

Indian writer, educationist

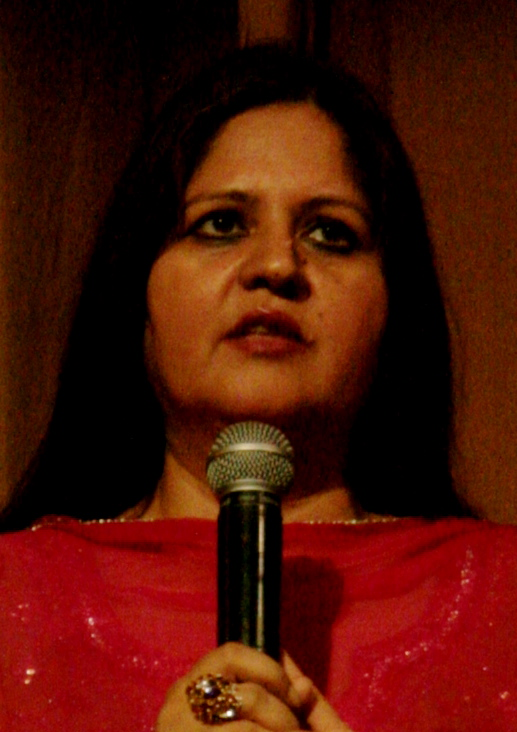
- Born: 13 April 1962
- Died: 11 January 2009 (aged 46)
- Occupations: Author, educationist, peace-activist
- Children: 2
- Writing career
- Genres: History, culture, education

Manveen Sandhu (13 April 1962 – 11 January 2009) was a Punjabi Indian artist, educationist, culture promoter and a peace activist. She was the creator and director of Punarjyot, an NGO focused on the preservation and promotion of Punjabi heritage. She also founded the Saanjh: Amritsar-Lahorioe festival to promote cultural interaction and better understanding between the cities of Amritsar & Lahore.

Sandhu was posthumously awarded the Kalpana Chawla award for promotion of art, culture and education. She produced several plays in an effort to revive the composite culture of Punjab, which had suffered a setback after the partition of India. She had also encouraged Pakistan-based artists and was instrumental in organising several joint cultural shows under the aegis of Saanjh and Punarjyot. She was married to Shivinder Singh Sandhu and had two children.

== Career ==
Sandhu authored the book, Maharaja Ranjit Singh: Personalitas Extraordinaire which chronicles the life and times of the Ranjit Singh, who was the first Maharaja of the Sikh Empire. Her research was instrumental in bringing a fair representation to Moran Sarkar, the dancing girl who Maharaja Ranjit Singh married in 1802.

Manveen Sandhu was also the principal of Spring Dale Senior School, and was noted for her exemplary integration of the Multiple Intelligences into the curriculum.

Her efforts to further education were recognised by Indian Ministry of Human Resource Development, which conferred the National Award 2008 on her under its scheme of National Award to Teachers. Kirat Sandhu and Sahiljit Sandhu received the award on her behalf from the Vice-President of India on Teacher's Day – 5 September 2009.

== Death ==
She died in a road accident along with her husband, Dr. Shivinder Sandhu, on 11 January 2009 while on the way from Bikaner to Amritsar.
