= Multana Singh =

Sikh prince

- Born: 1819; Lahore, Punjab, Sikh Empire
- Died: 1846, Sikh Empire
- Spouse: Chund Kaur; Maan Kanwar
- Issue: Kishan Singh; Keshra Singh; Arjan Singh
- House: Sukerchakia
- Father: Maharaja Ranjit Singh
- Mother: Rani Ratan Kaur

Kunwar Multana Singh Bahadur, sometimes styled as Shahzada (1819 - 1846) was the son of Ranjit Singh, Maharaja of Sikh Empire and Rani Ratan Kaur.

Maharaja Ranjit Singh named him after his conquest of Multan. He married Bakhtawar Kaur and had three sons: Kishan Singh, Keshra Singh, Arjan Singh. Sardar Arjan Singh served as a munsif in Punjab for many years. Multana Singh died in 1846. His mother had another son Lahora Singh who passed away in infancy.

== Family ==
=== Wives ===
The known wives of Multana Singh were:

- Chund Kaur, given a pension of Rs. 1,000 and had a residence possibly in Amritsar, had two sons named Keshun Singh and Kesra Singh
- Man Kaur, former wife of Boodhoo Munshi, Muslim from Lahore (likely a concubine originally), married possibly in 1857, had a son named Arjan Singh

=== Issues ===
The known male issues of Multana Singh were:

- Keshun Singh, son of Chund Kaur
- Kesra Singh, son of Chund Kaur
- Arjan Singh, son of Man Kaur, given a pension of Rs. 1,030, married the daughter of a Hindu Jatt zamindar of Amritsar
