= Pul Kanjri =

- Historical Site
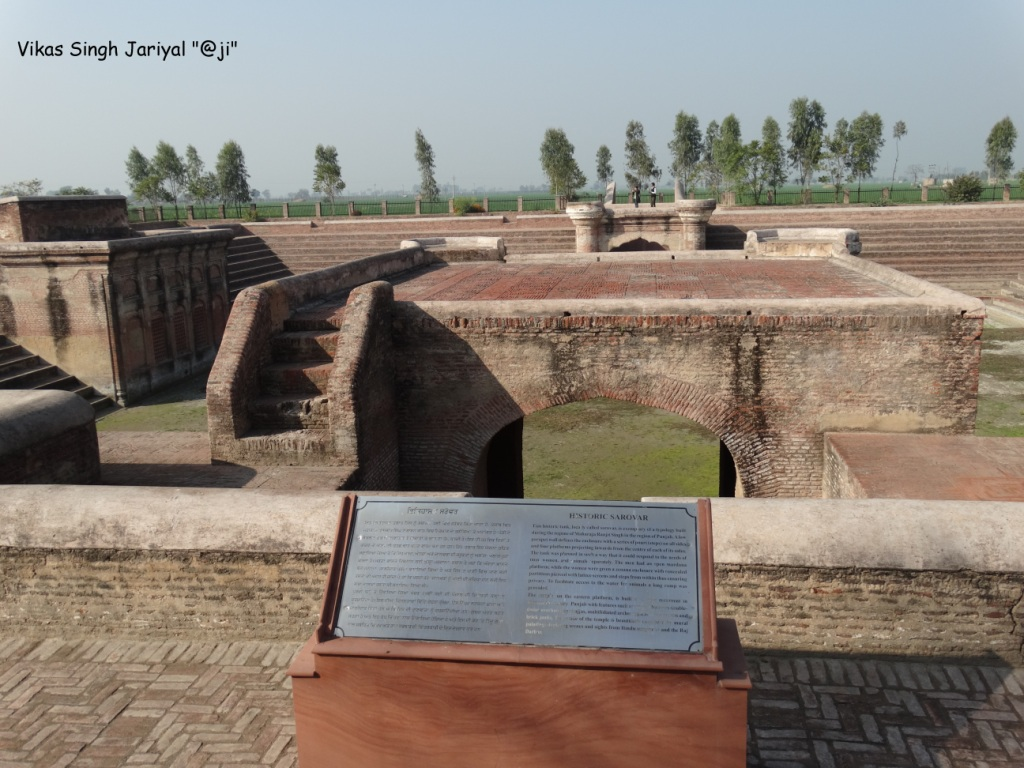

- Location in Punjab, India Pul Kanjri (India)
- Coordinates: 31°38′N 74°33′E
- Country: India
- State: Punjab
- District: Amritsar

Pul Kanjri is a historical site situated 35 km away from Amritsar on Amritsar-Lahore road, near the villages of Dhanoa Khurd and Dhanoa Kalan on the Attari border. It is one of the heritage sites built by Maharaja Ranjit Singh, where he used to rest while travelling with his troops. During his reign, Pul Kanjari was an important trading centre. The legend has it when Maharaja Ranjit Singh married Gul Bahar Begum, on their way to Lahore they had to cross this canal on Ravi river. People used to cross the canal by foot but Gul Bahar Begum refused to do so. Since Maharaja Ranjit Singh was deeply in love with Gul Bahar Begum, he had a small bridge built for her. Some part of the bridge still exists. It was named Pul Kanjri. It was greatly in news during 1971 war. This fortress also contains a bathing pool, a temple, a Gurudwara and a mosque.

People used to come to Pul Kanjri from far-flung areas, including Amritsar and Lahore, for shopping. The town was inhabited by Arora Sikhs, Muslims and Hindus who lived together until the partition of India. The historical town has been reduced to a tiny village now. The area is located on the present day border of the two states and it was briefly occupied by Pakistan in 1965 and 1971. However, the area was later returned to India as a part of peace treaty between the countries.

== History ==
"Moran" was a dancer from nearby village Makhanpura and used to perform in the Royal Court of Maharaja Ranjit Singh. On the way, she had to cross a small canal linked to river Ravi, which was built by the Mughal Emperor Shah Jahan to irrigate Shalimar Gardens of Lahore. This canal did not have a bridge. One day while crossing the canal Moran lost her silver sandals that had been presented to her by the Maharaja. Disappointed over the loss, she refused to perform in the court of Maharaja. When the incident was brought to the notice of Maharaja, he immediately ordered the construction of a bridge on the canal. The dancers were not given much respect in those days and they were addressed as "Kanjari". Hence the bridge constructed to facilitate Moran was known as "Pul Kanjari".

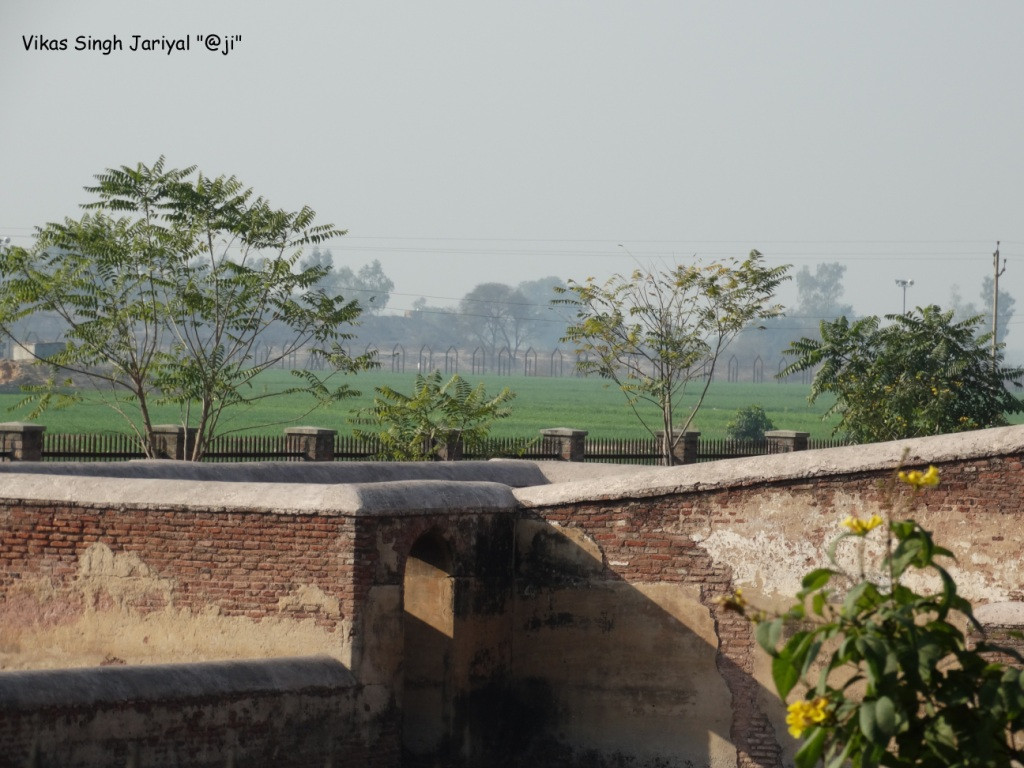
Fence on International Border visible from Pul Kanjari

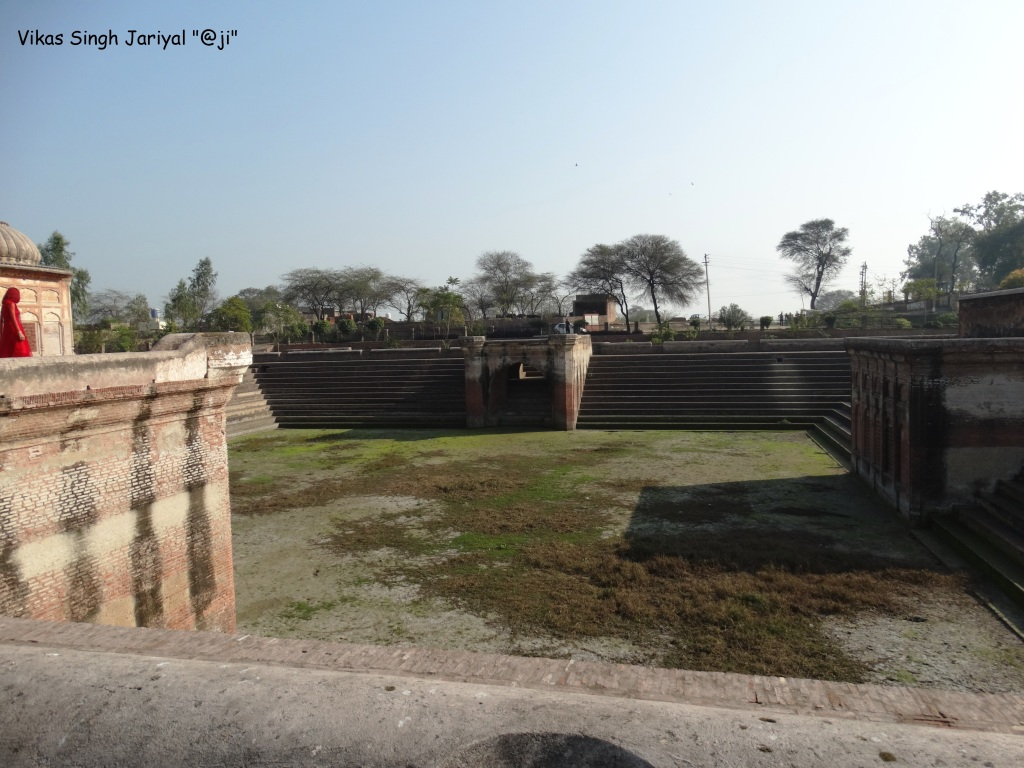
Pul kanjari Sarovar

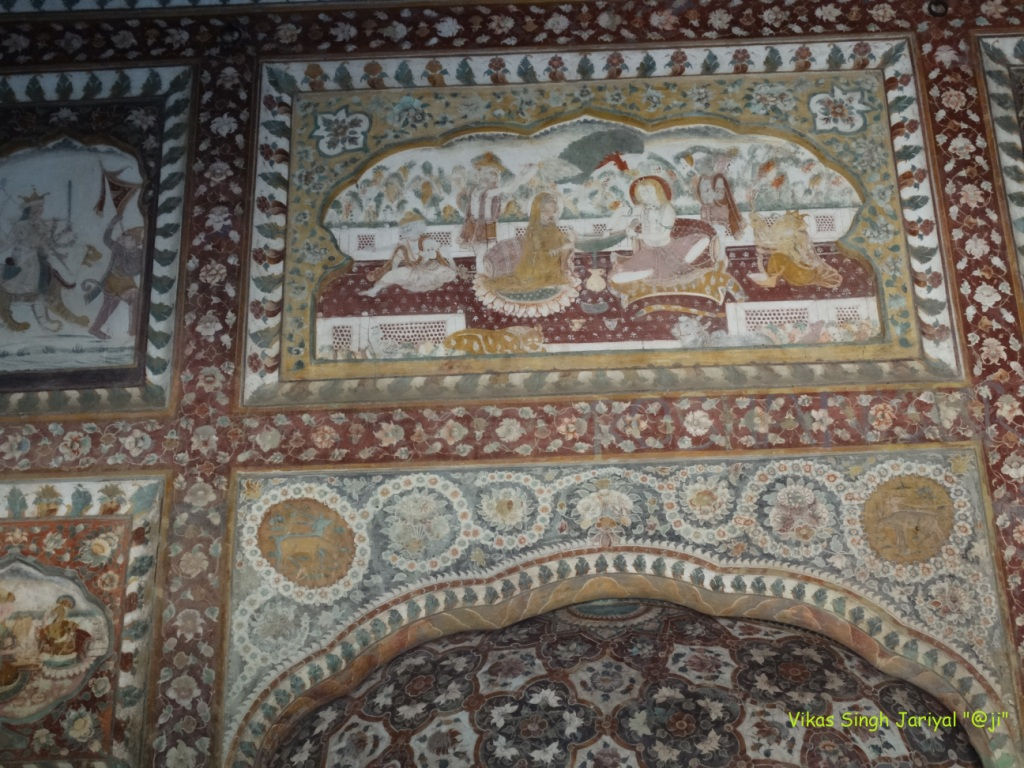
Beautiful wall Painting

Now, this historical memorial has been renovated and is being preserved by The Ministry of Tourism, Govt. of India and Govt. of Punjab. Renovations were made to Mandir and a Sarovar. The site is being maintained by Spring Dale Senior School, Amritsar under an MOU initiated by Rajiv Kumar Sharma, principal of Spring Dale Senior School Amritsar between Punjab Heritage and Tourism Promotion Board and the school since 2010.

== Shiv Temple ==
On the right side of the memorial is a Shiv Temple made of Nanakshahi Bricks. Inside on the ceiling of the temple and sides is fresco work depicting various Hindu deities from mythology including Shiva, Vishnu, Ram, Krishan and Goddesses. The most intriguing paintings, however are on the outer wall facing west. Most of these paintings have faded but people with keen eye can still make out depiction of Guru Nanak Dev Ji in one of the faded paintings along with Bala and Mardana. In other painting one can make out the depictions of legendary lovers as Sohni and Mahiwal in which Mahiwal is playing flute on the bank of the river while Sohni is swimming across the river. Other painting are difficult to decipher. These could be either lovers like Sassi Punnu or some Sufi Saints. It needs immediate attention of experts to preserve this part otherwise these will be damaged beyond recognition. Bullet marks from the earlier Indo-Pak wars can be seen on the west and north walls of the temple.

== Sarovar ==
Originally, it was a store house (pool) for the water, but later on the name Sarovar was given to it. The water to the pool was supplied from the nearby canal. There is an open space for the gents to take a dip and a covered one for the ladies, whereas there is a separate slope for the animals.

== Baradari ==
The stay house of Maharaja Ranjit Singh known as baradari (the house with 12 doors), is almost in ruins.

== Battle of Pul Kanjari ==
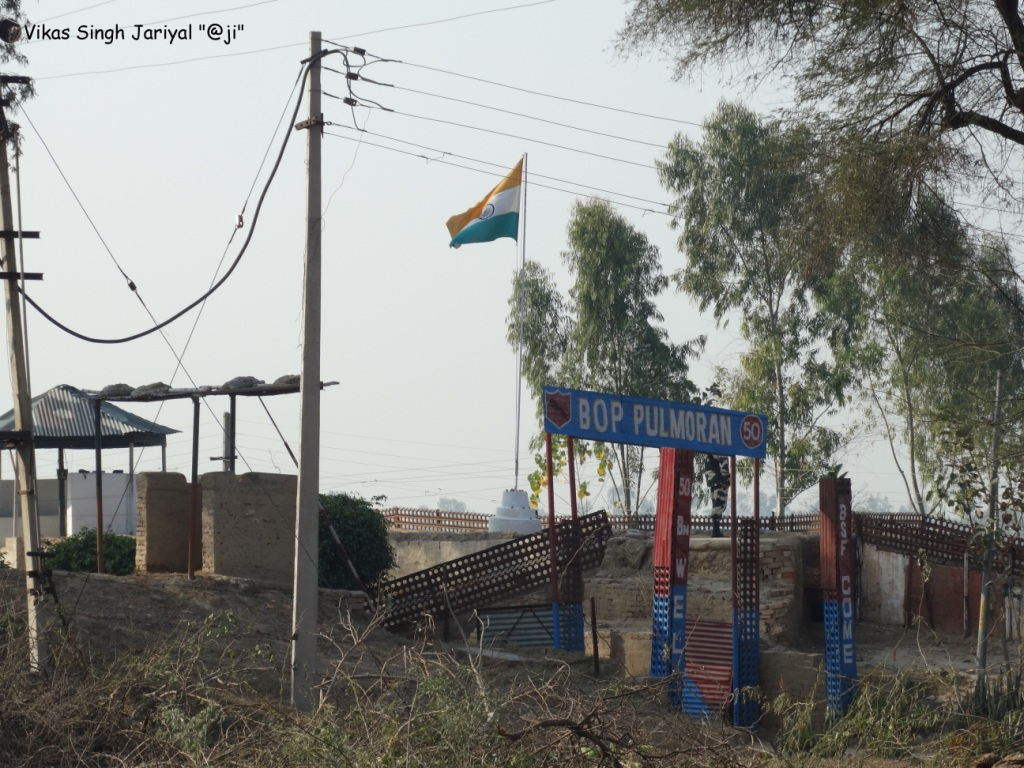
Border Outer Post Of BSF.

Pul Kanjri was captured by the Pakistani army during the Indo-Pak wars of 1965 and 1971. However, it was later returned to India as a part of peace treaty between the countries.

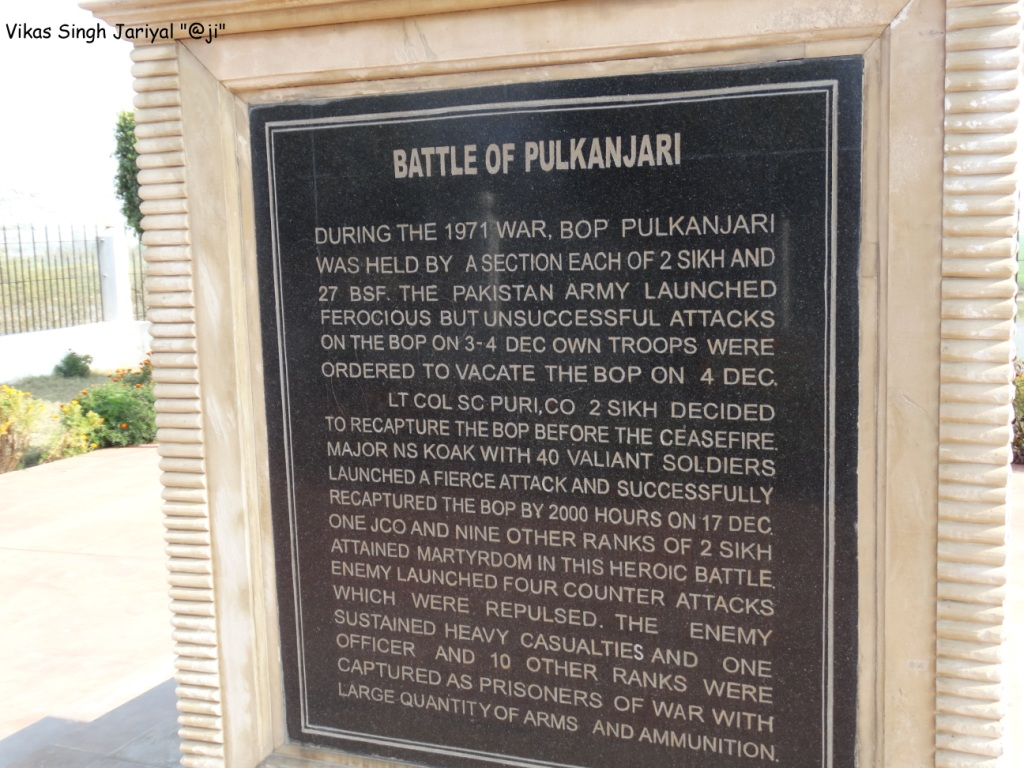
Plaque at Pul Kanjari War Memorial honoring Indian martyrs of the Indo-Pakistani War of 1971.

"On December 17th and 18th 1971, 2 Sikh Regiment attacked and recaptured the Pulkanjri village. During this attack L/Naik Shangara Singh displayed conspicuous gallantry in clearing two machinegun posts which were holding the attack up. Shangara Singh dashed through a minefield and hurled a grenade at one of the post. He then charged the second gun and leaping over the loophole he snatched the gun from its occupants. As he stood with the gun in his hands he received a fatal burst in his abdomen and fell to the ground with the gun still in his hand. He was awarded a posthumous Maha Vir Chakra. N/ Sub. Gian Singh received a posthumous Vir Chakra. The Pakistanis tried to recapture the Pulkanjri village using a company of 43 Punjab and two companies of 15 Punjab. The Sikhs stood firm and inflicted heavy casualties on the enemy's 15 Punjab. In a local counter attack they [Indians] captured 1 officer and 8 OR's of 43 Punjab and 4 OR's of 15 Punjab [of Pakistan].)"

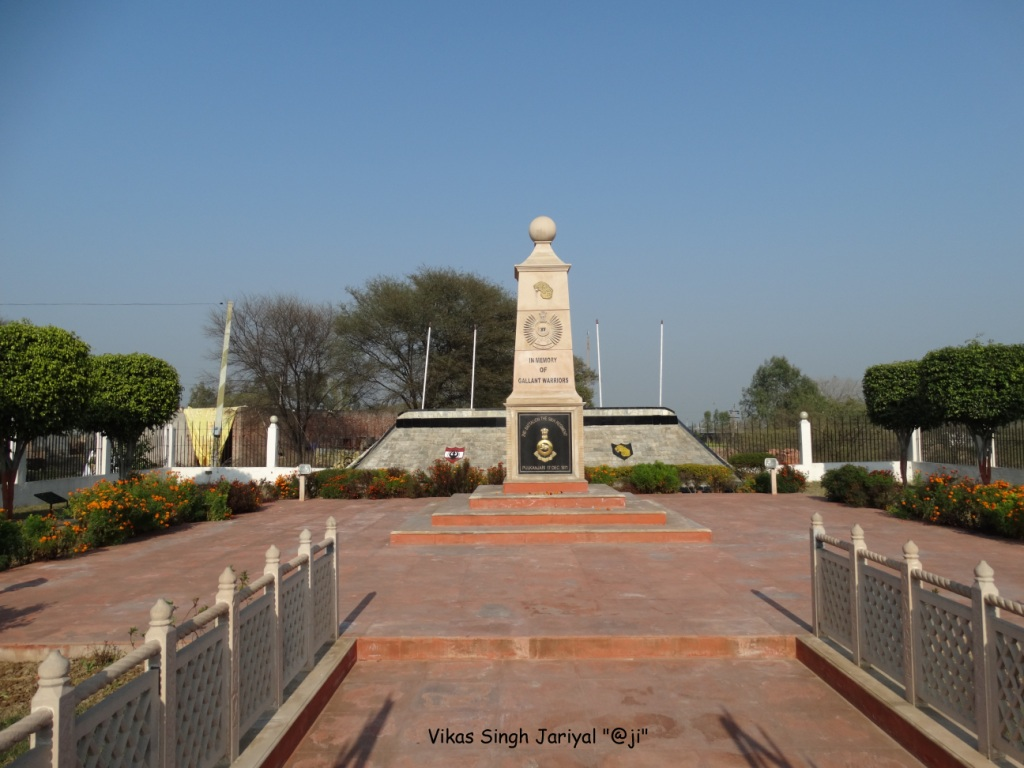
War memorial of Indo- Pak war 1971.

== How to reach ==
It is situated nearly 35 km north from Amritsar railway station and 5 km north from Wagah, it lies near village Audhar. After crossing Atari from Amritsar side, nearly 500 yards ahead, there is a road on the right, leading to village Attalgarh through Mode (ਮੋਦੇ). After Mode (ਮੋਦੇ) the road ends at Pul Kanjari.

Known for her interest in art & history and its preservation, Manveen Kaur Sandhu stressed for the need to replace the name "Pul Kanjari" to "Pul Moran" as the word kanjari is taken as an abuse in Punjabi language. At the same time Ms. Sandhu cited that word Kanjari is a mutation of Persian word Kanchani (means dipped in gold and fully blossomed). She cited that it was the quality and behaviour of Moran that brought her near the king. The site is being maintained by Spring Dale Senior School, Amritsar under an MOU signed between Punjab Heritage and Tourism Promotion Board and the school principal Rajiv Kumar Sharma. There is a permanent care taker cum guide at the site appointed by the school to help the visitors. The school has done nice plantation at the site and placed benches for the comfort of visitors. The school has also provisioned for fabricated washrooms. The site has become a favorite with pre-wedding shoot enthusiasts, video shoots, history lovers and seekers of less known heritage.

== See also ==
- Tourism in Punjab, India
