= Moran Sarkar =

Indian queen

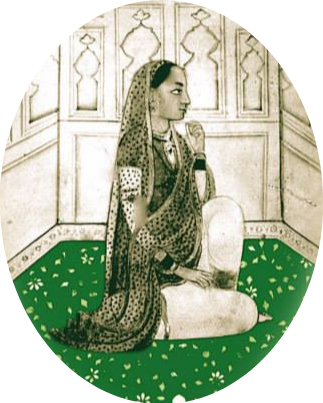
- A miniature painting of Moran.
- Born: c. 1781
- Died: 1862
- Burial place: Miani Sahib Graveyard, Lahore
- Spouse: Ranjit Singh

Moran Sarkar (c. 1781–1862) was the queen and wife of Maharaja Ranjit Singh of the Sikh Empire. She was a nautch girl before she became a queen.

Maharaja Ranjit Singh was supposedly punished by flogging by Akali Phula Singh for marrying her in 1806. Mai Moran was sent to live in Pathankot district, in 1811.

== Life ==
Mai Moran was born in a Kashmiri Muslim family in Makhan Windi, near Amritsar. She was a nautch girl. Maharaja Ranjit Singh used to meet her and she used to dance for him at the Baradari of Maharaja Ranjit Singh halfway between Amritsar and Lahore. The place was since called Pul Kanjri but now its name has been changed to 'Pul Moran'. She later married Maharaja Ranjit Singh, a year after he became the maharaja of Lahore at the age of 21 and was officially given a name as Maharani Sahiba.

She was considered to be very learned in arts and letters. She was known for her philanthropic acts and in bringing Maharaja's attention to many problems. Some coins related to her were struck, which are termed Moranshahis.

The Maharaja at Moran's request, built a mosque called as Masjid-e-Tawaifan, which was renamed in 1998 as Mai Moran Masjid in Lahore. This is located in Lahore's bazaar now called Pappar Mandi near Shah Almi Gate.

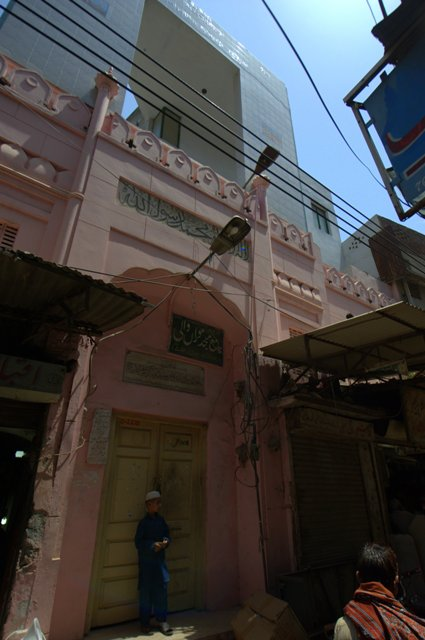
٘٘٘٘Mai Moran Masjid in Lahore

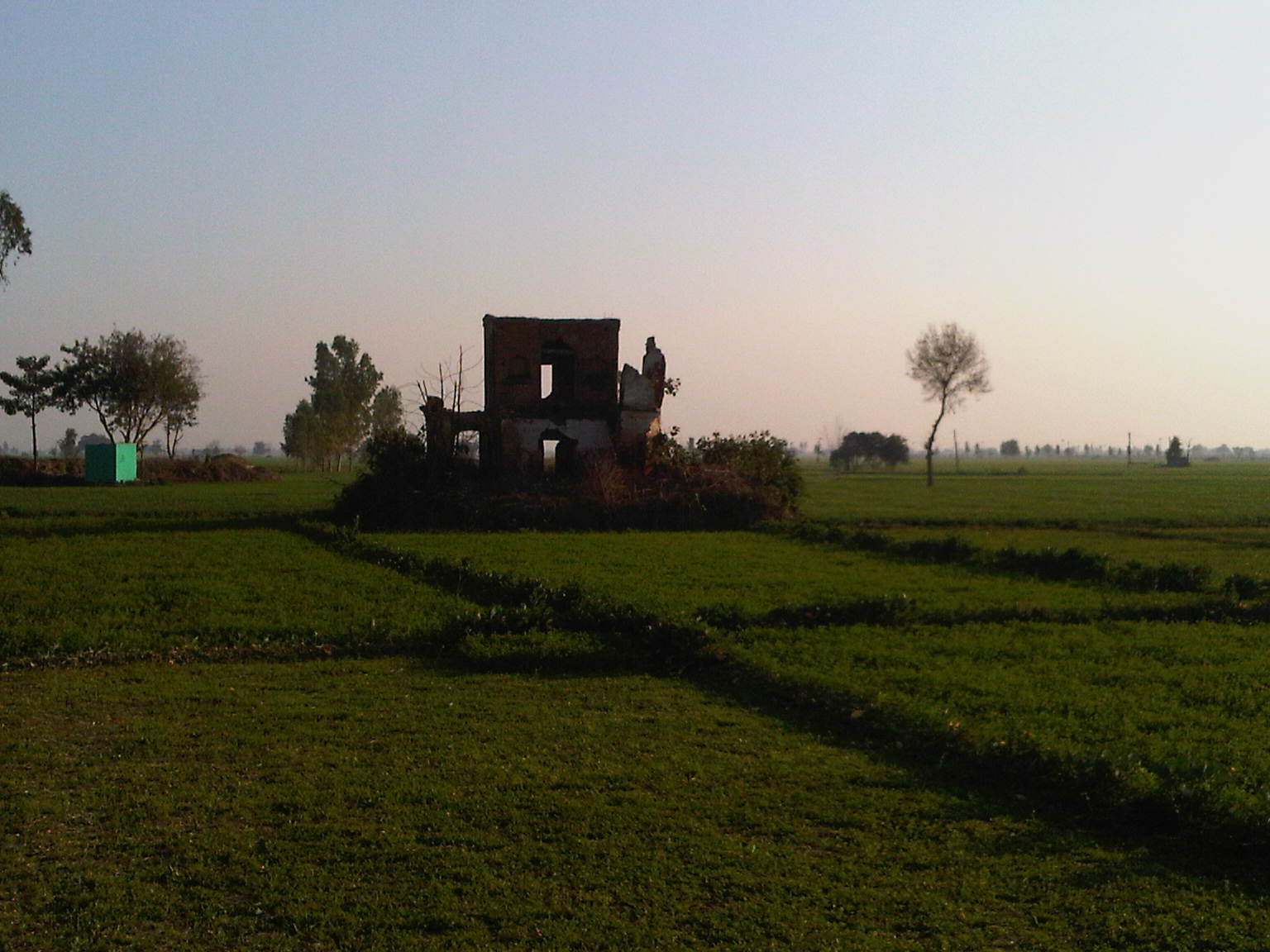
The dilapidated Baradari at Pul Moran on the India - Pakistan border

== Play ==
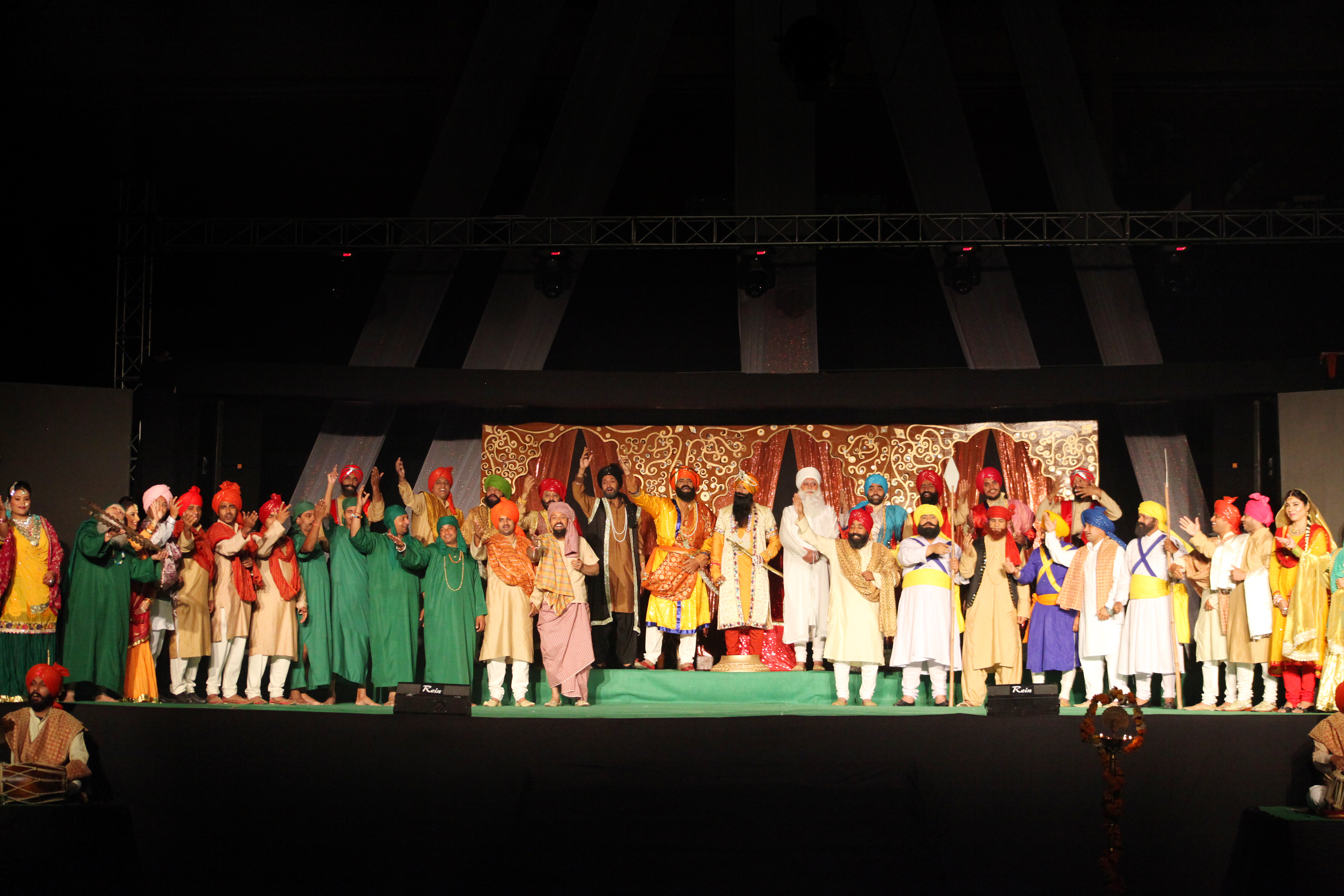

Her life story with Maharaja Ranjit Singh was made into a play by Manveen Sandhu and directed by Kewal Dhaliwal. The same play written by Manveen Sandhu was translated and directed by Rajiv Kumar Sharma principal Spring Dale Senior School, Amritsar during CBSE National Sahodaya Conference held at Amritsar in November 2013. The audience consisted of appx. 1000 school principals, CBSE officials and other delegates. The cast entirely consisted of school teachers. Rajiv Kumar Sharma presented the play Moran Sarkar one last time in the same year during Indo-Pak Peace Festival Saanjh 2013 held at Spring Dale Senior School, Amritsar.

== See also ==
- Sikh Period in Lahore
- Tawaif
- Mujra
- Nautch
