= Ranjit Singh =

Sikh Maharaja from 1801 to 1839

Ranjit Singh: ਰਣਜੀਤ ਸਿੰਘ; رݨجیت سنگھ
- Maharaja of Punjab; Maharaja of Lahore; Sarkar-i-Wallah (Head of Government); Sarkar Khalsaji; Singh Sahib
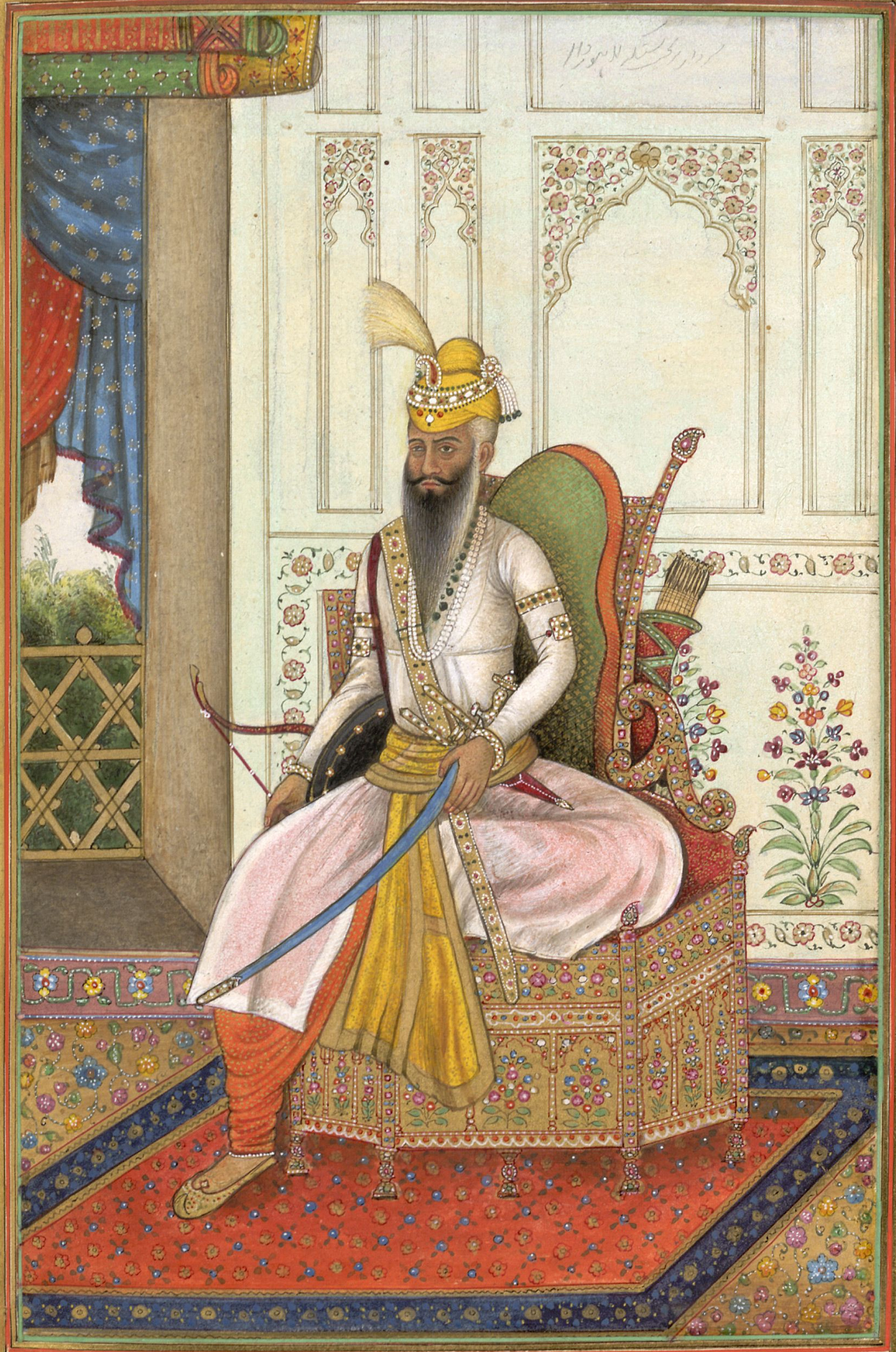
- Painting of Maharaja Ranjit Singh from the Tazkirat al-Umara, written for James Skinner, ca.1830

1st Maharaja of the Sikh Empire
- Reign: 12 April 1801 – 27 June 1839
- Investiture: 12 April 1801 at Lahore Fort
- Predecessor: Position established
- Successor: Kharak Singh
- Wazir: Khushal Singh Jamadar (1801 – 1818); Dhian Singh Dogra (1818 – 1839)

Maharaja of Kashmir
- Reign: 3 July 1819 – 27 June 1839
- Predecessor: Position established (Ayub Shah Durrani as the Emir of Kashmir)
- Successor: Kharak Singh
- Governor: List: Diwan Moti Ram (1819 – 1820; 1821 – 1826); Hari Singh Nalwa (1820 – 1821); Chuni Lal (1826 – 1827); Diwan Kirpa Ram (1827 – 1831); Bhama Singh Ardali (1831 – 1832); Sher Singh (1832 – 1834); Mihan Singh Kumedan (1834 – 1841); Shaikh Ghulam Muhy-ud-Din (1841 – 1846); Shaikh Imam-ud-Din (1846)

Sardar of Sukerchakia Misl
- Reign: 15 April 1792 – 11 April 1801
- Predecessor: Maha Singh
- Successor: Position abolished
- Born: Buddh Singh; 13 November 1780; Gujranwala, Sukerchakia Misl, Sikh Confederacy (present-day Punjab, Pakistan)
- Died: 27 June 1839 (aged 58); Lahore, Sikh Empire (present-day Punjab, Pakistan)
- Burial: Cremated remains stored in the Samadhi of Ranjit Singh, Lahore
- Spouse: Mehtab Kaur; Datar Kaur; Jind Kaur; See list for others
- Issue among others...: Kharak Singh; Sher Singh; Duleep Singh
- House: Sukerchakia
- Dynasty: Sikh Empire
- Father: Maha Singh
- Mother: Raj Kaur
- Religion: Sikhism
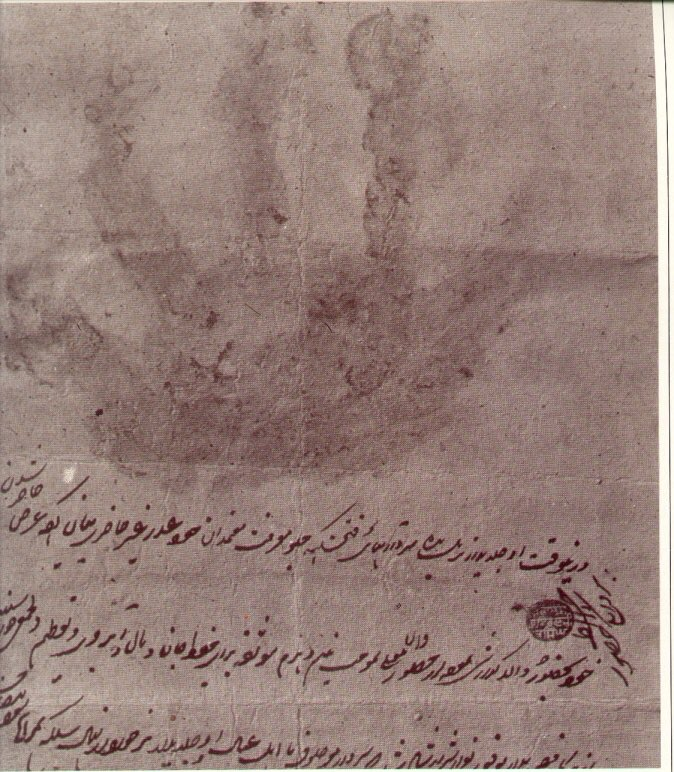
- Signature (handprint)

Ranjit Singh (Note: Persian: رنجیت سنگه; Gurmukhi: ਰਣਜੀਤ ਸਿੰਘ; Shahmukhi: رݨجیت سنگھ; Punjabi pronunciation: [ɾəɳd͡ʒiːt̪(ə̆) sɪ˩˥ŋɡ].) (Punjabi pronunciation: [ɾəɳd͡ʒiːt̪(ə̆) sɪ˩˥ŋɡ]; c. 13 November 1780 – 27 June 1839) was the founder and the first maharaja of the Sikh Empire, ruling from 1801 until his death in 1839. Starting as a local chieftain, by the time of his death he had expanded his kingdom from Ladakh in the north to the borders of Sindh, and from Khyber Pass in the west to the river Sutlej in the east.

Ranjit Singh was born to Maha Singh, the leader of the Sukerchakia Misl, and fought his first battle alongside his father at the age of ten. After Maha Singh died during his early teenage years, Ranjit Singh became leader of the misl. He was the most prominent of the Sikh leaders who opposed Zaman Shah, the ruler of Durrani Empire, during his third invasion. After the retreat of Zaman Shah in 1799, he captured Lahore from the Sikh triumvirate which had been ruling the city since 1765. At the age of 21, he was formally crowned at Lahore.

Before his rise, the Punjab had been fragmented into a number of warring Sikh, Muslim, and Hindu states. A large part of Punjab was under direct Durrani control. By 1813, Ranjit Singh had successfully annexed the Sikh misls and taken over the local kingdoms; the following decades saw the conquest of Durrani Afghan-ruled territories of Multan, Kashmir and Peshawar into his expanding Sikh Empire. Ranjit Singh established friendly diplomatic relations with the British after the treaty of Amritsar.

During his reign, Ranjit Singh introduced military reforms, structural changes in administration, and modernisation. His Khalsa army and government included Sikhs, Muslims, Hindus, and Europeans. His legacy includes a period of Sikh cultural and artistic renaissance, including the rebuilding of the Harmandir Sahib in Amritsar as well as other major gurdwaras, such as the Takht Sri Patna Sahib and the Hazur Sahib Nanded under his sponsorship despite being located outside of his realm. Ranjit Singh was succeeded by his son Kharak Singh after his death in 1839.

== Early years ==
Ranjit Singh was born in a Sandhawalia Jat Sikh family on 13 November 1780 to Maha Singh and Raj Kaur in Gujranwala, Punjab (present-day Punjab, Pakistan). His mother Raj Kaur was the daughter of Sidhu Jat Sikh ruler Raja Gajpat Singh of Jind. (Note: It has been argued that Ranjit Singh was born into a Jat clan (got in Punjabi) named Sansi (which the Sandhawalias originate from), which is unrelated to the nomadic caste sharing the same name, leading to the misattribution of his origin to the Sansi caste by some.) Qadir Yar, his court poet, later traced his descent from Salban, the legendary monarch of Sialkot; the scholar Sumail Singh Sidhu sees resurrection of "ancient Punjabi tradition and its heroes" in the fact that instead of traditional Suryavanshi or Chandravanshi lineage, Ranjit Singh was ascribed a distinct Punjabi genealogy.

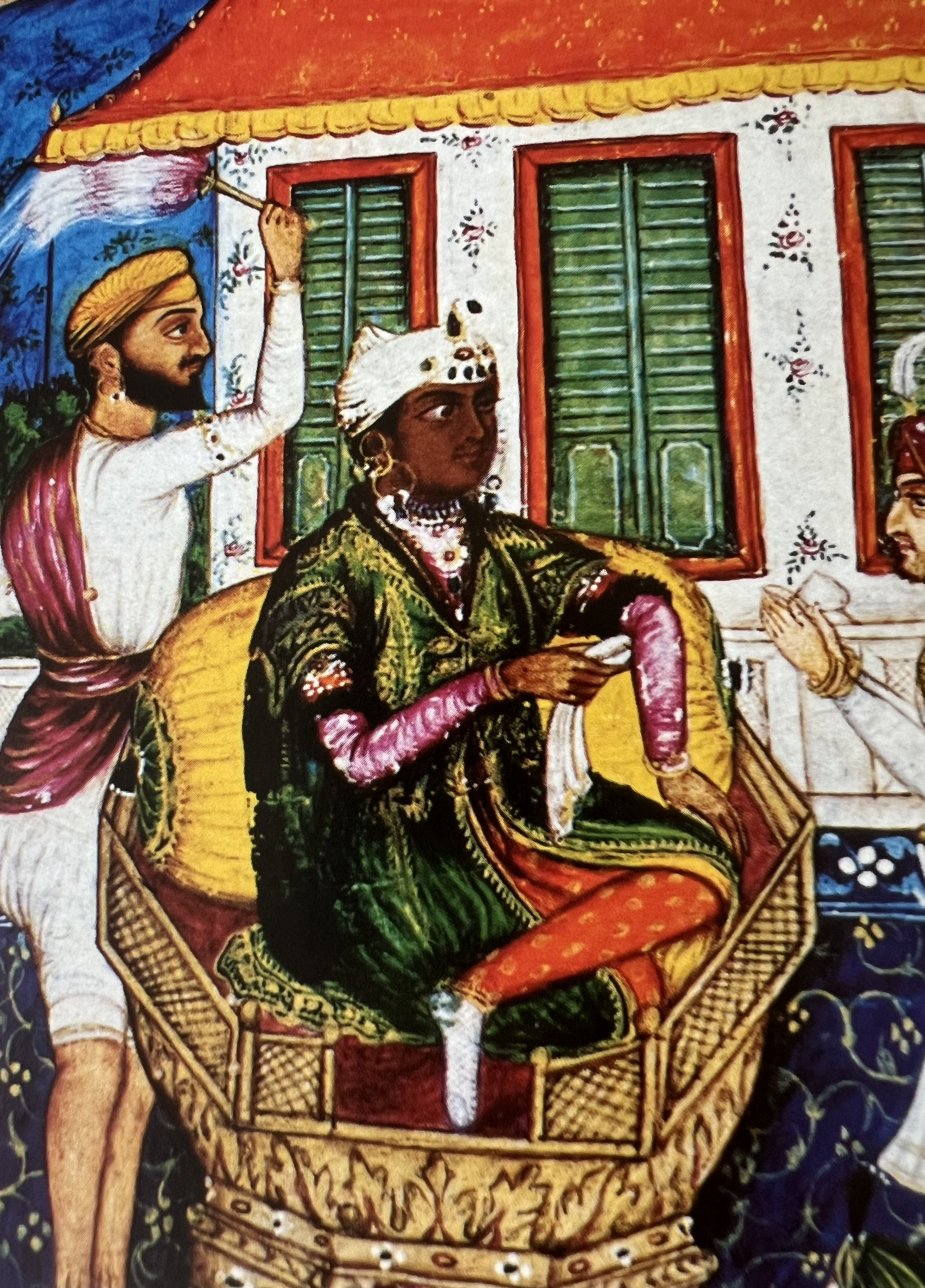
Painting of a young Ranjit Singh from the Iqbalnama-i-Maharaja Ranjit Singh

Upon his birth, he was named Buddh Singh after his ancestor who was first in line to take the Amrit Sanchaar. The child's name was changed to Ranjit (literally, "victor in battle") Singh ("lion") by his father to commemorate his army's victory over the Chattha chief Pir Muhammad. Ranjit Singh contracted smallpox as an infant, which resulted in the loss of sight in his left eye and a pockmarked face.

== Reign ==
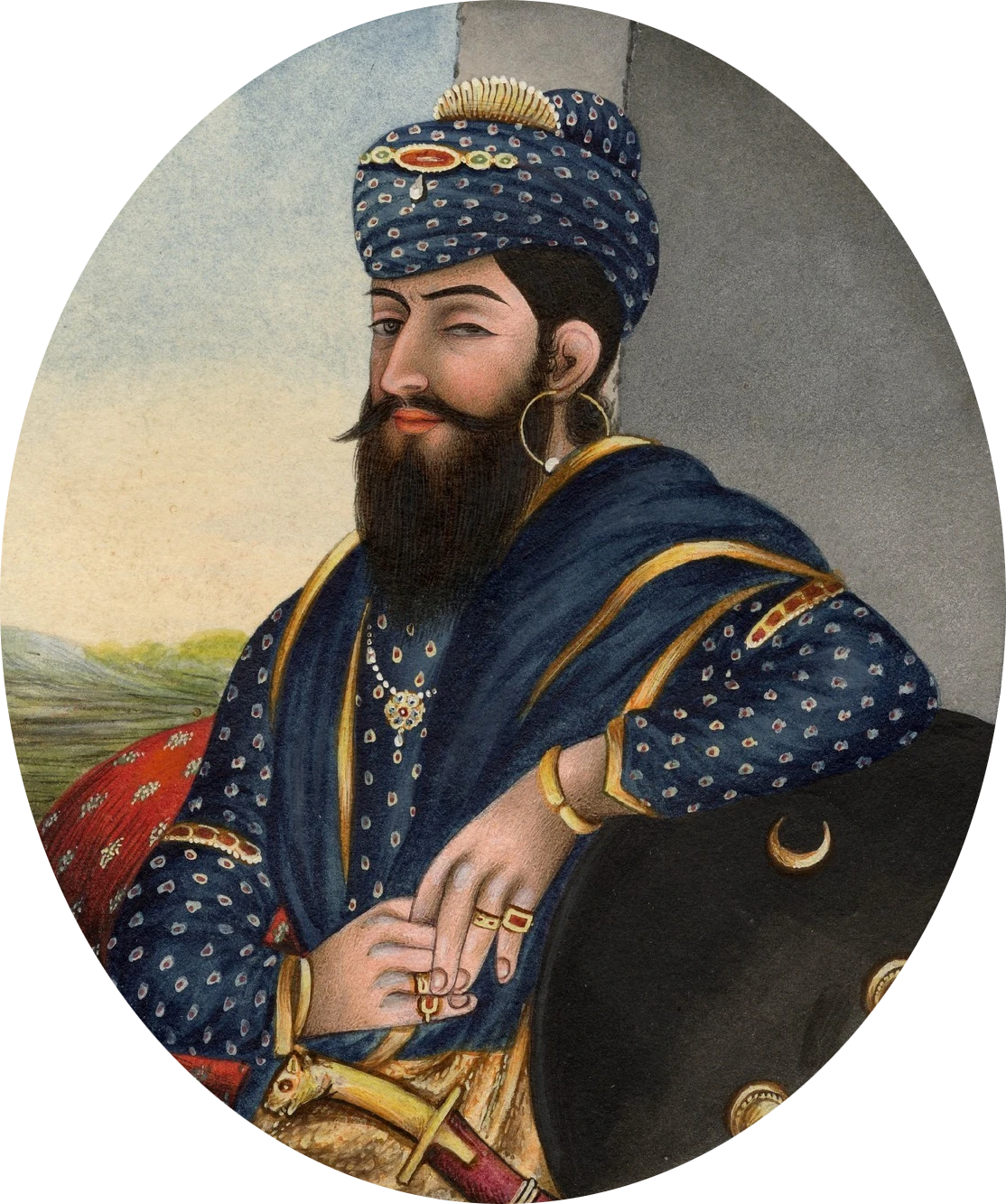
Maharaja Ranjit Singh c. 1810–1820

In 1792 at age 12, his father died and Ranjit Singh became the minor head of the Sukerchakia Misl. He then inherited his ancestral Sukerchakia misl estates and was raised by his mother Raj Kaur, who, along with Lakhpat Rai, also managed the estates. The first attempt on his life was made when he was 13, by Hashmat Khan, but Ranjit Singh prevailed and killed the assailant instead. At age 18, his mother died and Lakhpat Rai was assassinated, and thereon he was aided by his mother-in-law from his first marriage. He succeeded to the throne in 1799 after removing his mother as regnant by putting her to death. The young Ranjit Singh formed relations with the Kanhaiya and Nakkai misls and would consolidate his territory.

=== Early conquests ===
Ranjit Singh's fame grew in 1797, at age 17, when the Durrani Shah Zaman attempted to bring Panjab into his control through his general Shahanchi Khan and 12,000 soldiers. The victory in the 1798 battle of Amritsar gained Ranjit Singh recognition. Ranjit Singh did not resist Zaman Shah when he entered Lahore in 1798. Blocked off all food and supplies, and burnt all crops and food sources that could have supported the Afghan army, which retreated to Afghanistan.

In 1799, Ranjit Singh leading an army of 25,000, supported by another 25,000 soldiers led by his mother-in-law Rani Sada Kaur of Kanhaiya misl, attacked the region controlled by Bhangi Sikhs centered around Lahore. The Bhangis escaped, marking Lahore as the first major conquest of Ranjit Singh. The Sufi Muslim and Hindu population of Lahore welcomed the rule of Ranjit Singh. In 1800, the ruler of the Jammu region ceded control of his region to Ranjit Singh.

In 1801, Ranjit Singh was crowned at a formal investiture ceremony carried out by Baba Sahib Singh Bedi — a descendant of Guru Nanak. On the day of his coronation, prayers were performed across mosques, temples and gurudwaras in his territories for his long life. Ranjit Singh called his rule "Sarkar Khalsa", and his court "Darbar Khalsa". He ordered new coins to be issued in the name of Guru Nanak named the "NanakShahi" ("of the Emperor Nanak").

=== Expansion ===
In 1802, Ranjit Singh, aged 22, took Amritsar from the Bhangi Sikh misl, paid homage at the Harmandir Sahib temple, which had previously been attacked and desecrated by the invading Afghan army, and announced that he would renovate and rebuild it with marble and gold.

On 1 January 1806, Ranjit Singh signed a treaty with the British officials of the East India Company, in which he agreed that his Sikh forces would not attempt to expand south of the Sutlej River, and the Company agreed that it would not attempt to militarily cross the Sutlej River into the Sikh territory.

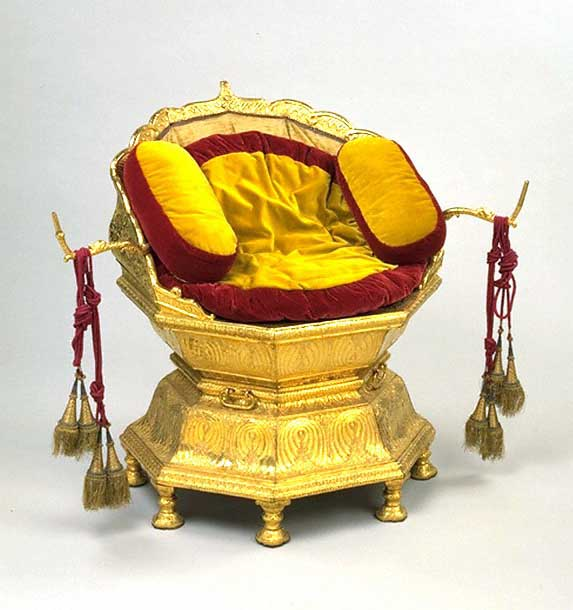
Maharaja Ranjit Singh's throne, c. 1820–1830

In 1807, Ranjit Singh's forces attacked the Muslim-ruled principality of Kasur and, after a month of fierce fighting, defeated the Kheshgi chief Qutb-ud-Din, thus expanding his empire northwest towards Afghanistan. In the same year he also annexed the Sial-ruled Jhang.

The most significant encounters between the Sikhs in the command of the Maharaja and the Afghans were in 1813, 1823, 1834 and 1837. In 1813, Ranjit Singh's general Mohkam Chand led the Sikh forces against the Afghan forces of Shah Mahmud led by Fateh Khan Barakzai. The Afghans lost their stronghold of Attock Fort in that battle.

In 1813–14, Ranjit Singh's first attempt to expand into Kashmir, which was being governed by Azim Khan, failed. In 1819 at the Battle of Shopian, he successfully defeated the Afghan rulers and annexed Kashmir Valley, stretching his rule into the north and the Jhelum valley, beyond the foothills of the Himalayas, along with a yearly revenue of seventy lakh rupees. Diwan Moti Ram was appointed governor of Kashmir.

In 1818, Darbar's forces led by Kharak Singh and Misr Dewan Chand occupied Multan, killing Nawab Muzaffar Khan and defeating his forces, which ended Afghan influence in Punjab. The whole Bari Doab came under his rule with that conquest. With the defeat of the Nawab of Mankera in 1821, the entire Sind Sagar Doab came under subjugation by the Sikhs. In 1823, the Yusufzai Pashtuns fought the army of Ranjit Singh north of the Kabul River.

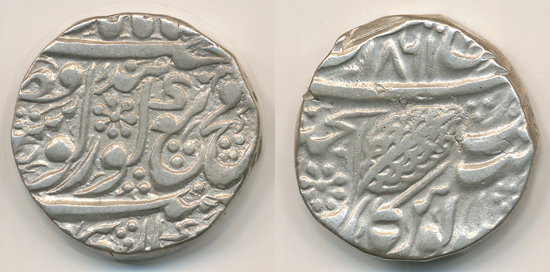
Coins were issued under the rule of Maharaja Ranjit Singh.

In 1834, Mohammed Azim Khan once again marched towards Peshawar with an army of 25,000 Khattak and Yusufzai tribesmen in the name of jihad, to fight against Ranjit Singh. The maharaja defeated the forces. Yar Mohammad Khan was pardoned and was reinvested as governor of Peshawar with an annual revenue of Rs one lac ten thousand to Lahore Darbar.

In 1835, the Afghans and Sikhs met again at the Standoff at the Khyber Pass; however, it ended without a battle. In 1837, the Battle of Jamrud, became the last confrontation between the Sikhs led by him and the Afghans, which displayed the extent of the western boundaries of the Sikh Empire.

On 25 November 1838, the two most powerful armies on the Indian subcontinent assembled in a grand review at Ferozepore as Ranjit Singh, the Maharajah of the Punjab brought out the Dal Khalsa to march alongside the sepoy troops of the East India Company and the British troops in India. In 1838, he agreed to a treaty with the British viceroy Lord Auckland to restore Shuja Shah Durrani to the Afghan throne in Kabul. In pursuance of this agreement, the British army of the Indus entered Afghanistan from the south, while Ranjit Singh's troops went through the Khyber Pass and took part in the victory parade in Kabul.

=== Extent of the rule ===
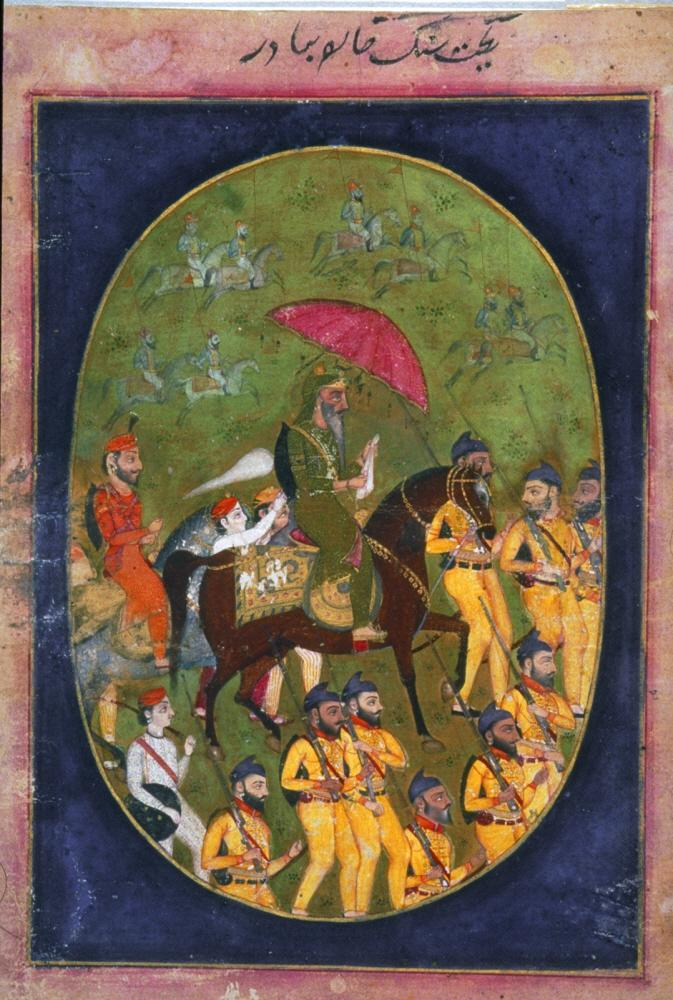
Maharaja Ranjit Singh on horseback (with black hairs still visible in his beard), circa 1830–1839

The Sikh Empire, also known as the Sikh Raj and Sarkar-a-Khalsa, was in the Punjab region, the name of which means "the land of the five rivers". The five rivers are the Beas, Ravi, Sutlej, Chenab and Jhelum, all of which are tributaries of the river Indus.

The geographical reach of the Sikh Empire under Singh included all lands north of Sutlej River, and south of the high valleys of the northwestern Himalayas. The major towns at the time included Srinagar, Attock, Peshawar, Bannu, Rawalpindi, Jammu, Gujrat, Sialkot, Kangra, Amritsar, Lahore and Multan.

Muslims formed around 70%, Hindus formed around 24%, and Sikhs formed around 6–7% of the total population living in Singh's empire

== Administration ==
=== Governance ===
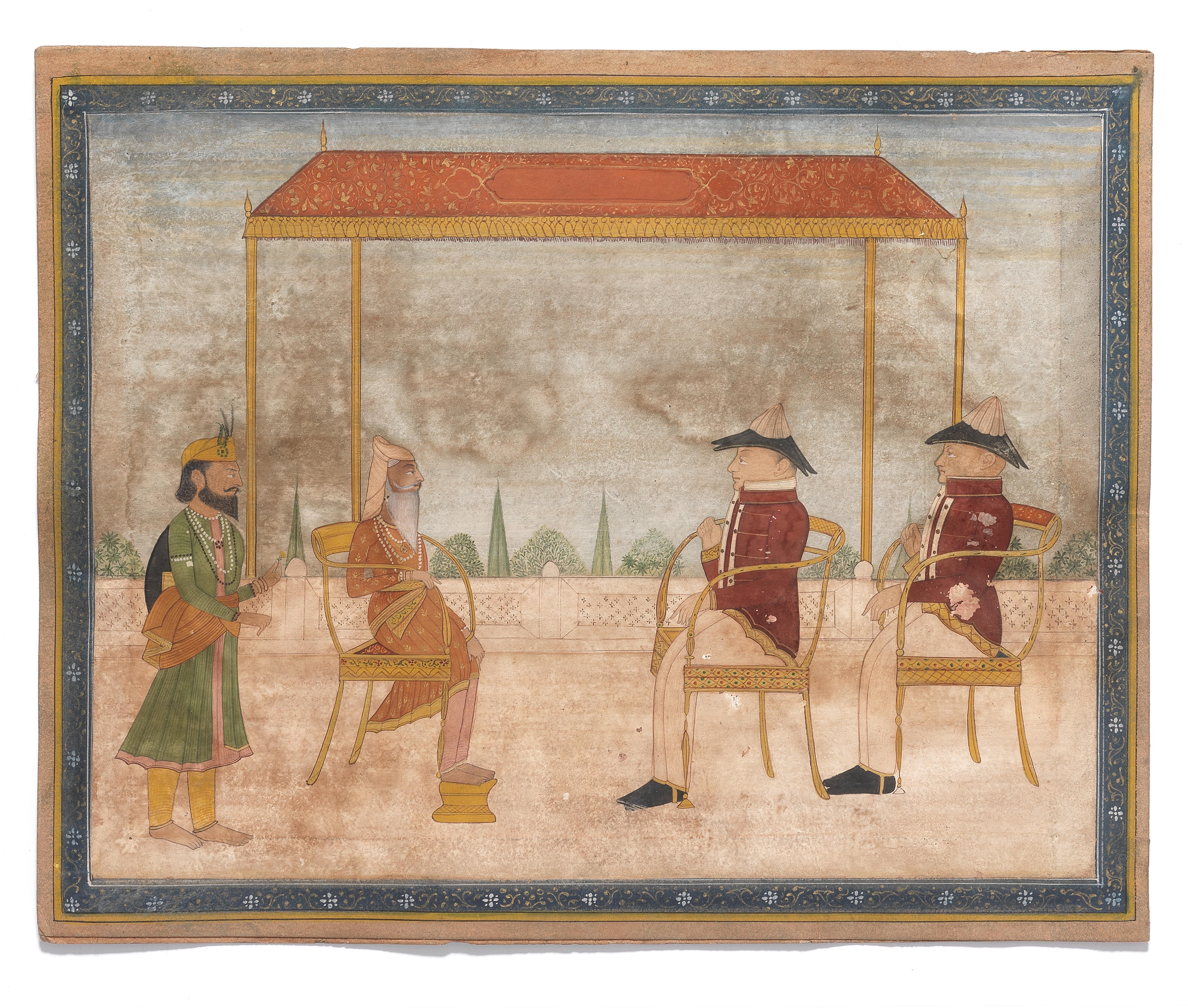
Maharaja Ranjit Singh with two British officers, artist unknown, 19th century, gouache and gold on paper

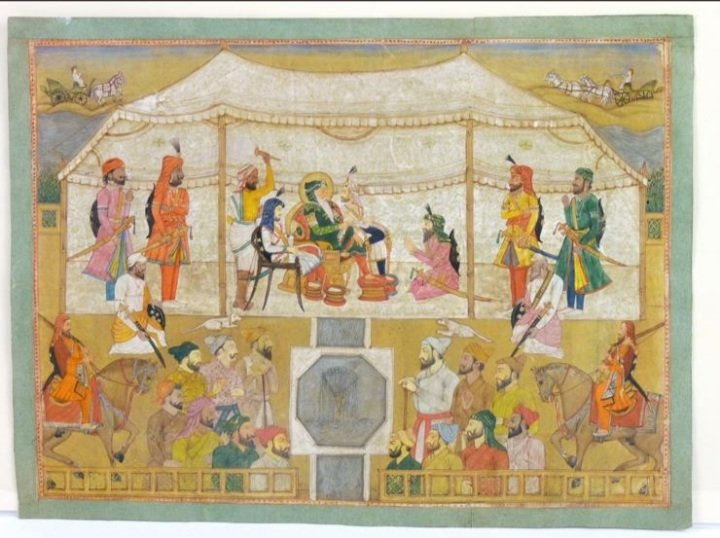
Darbar (royal court) of Maharaja Ranjit Singh behind held outdoors using a large tent

Ranjit Singh allowed men from different religions and races to serve in his army and his government in various positions of authority. His army included a few Europeans, such as the Frenchman Jean-François Allard, and Italian Jewish Jean-Baptiste Ventura though Singh maintained a policy of refraining from recruiting Britons into his service, aware of British designs on the Indian subcontinent. Despite his recruitment policies, he did maintain a diplomatic channel with the British; in 1828, he sent gifts to George IV and in 1831, he sent a mission to Simla to confer with the British Governor General, William Bentinck, which was followed by the Ropar Meeting; while in 1838, he cooperated with them in removing the hostile emir in Afghanistan.

=== Religious policies ===
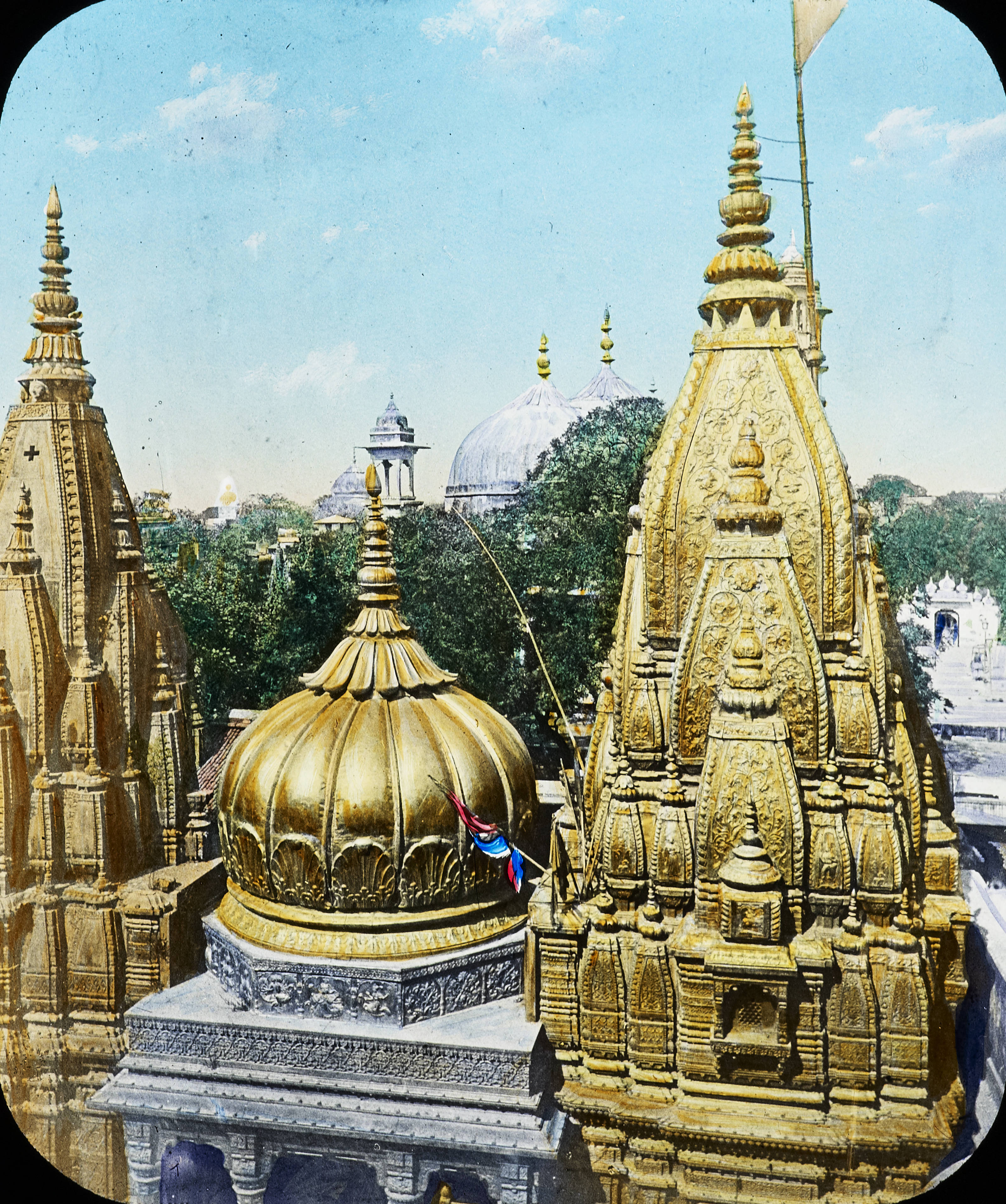
In 1835, Maharaja Ranjit Singh donated 1 tonne of gold for plating the Kashi Vishwanath Temple's dome.

As consistent with many Punjabis of that time, Ranjit Singh was a secular king and followed the Sikh path. His policies were based on respect for all communities: Hindu, Sikh and Muslim. A devoted Sikh, Ranjit Singh restored and built historic Sikh Gurdwaras — most famously, the Harmandir Sahib, and used to celebrate his victories by offering thanks at the Harmandir. He also joined the Hindus in their temples out of respect for their sentiments. The veneration of cows was promoted and cow slaughter was punishable by death under his rule. He ordered his soldiers to neither loot nor molest civilians.

He did prioritise Sikhism, proof of this being that people who converted to Sikhism were given jagirs (land grants) and were more likely to get high positions, which is why many started wearing turbans and growing out their beards and moustaches. It was recorded in the Umdat-I-Tawarikh that a young Brahmin asked Ranjit Singh for a Jagir, he had replied that he was only receive it if he became a Khalsa- the fathers boy, a Pandit, wept but the boy became a Khalsa and was received with a plume, 200 rupees and a jagir. Every official letter started with 'Akal Sahai', 'Sriakalji' or 'Ik Onkar'. The Jagir of Gurudwara Janam Asthan in Nankana Sahib dwarfed all other religious jagirs, it was around 16,000 acres.

He built several gurdwaras, Hindu temples and even mosques, and one in particular was Mai Moran Masjid, built at the behest of his beloved Muslim wife, Moran Sarkar. The Sikhs led by Singh never razed places of worship to the ground belonging to the enemy. However, he did convert Muslim mosques into other uses. For example, Ranjit Singh's army desecrated Lahore's Badshahi Mosque and converted it into an ammunition store, and horse stables. Lahore's Moti Masjid (Pearl Mosque) was converted into "Moti Mandir" (Pearl Temple) by the Sikh army, and Sonehri Mosque was converted into a Sikh Gurdwara, but upon the request of Sufi Fakir (Satar Shah Bukhari), Ranjit Singh restored the latter to a mosque. Lahore's Begum Shahi Mosque was also used as a gunpowder factory, earning it the nickname Barudkhana Wali Masjid, or "Gunpowder Mosque."

Singh's sovereignty was accepted by Afghan and Punjabi Muslims, who fought under his banner against the Afghan forces of Nadir Shah and later Azim Khan. His court was ecumenical in composition: his prime minister, Dhian Singh, was a Hindu (Dogra); his foreign minister, Fakir Azizuddin, was a Muslim; and his finance minister, Dina Nath, was also a Hindu (Brahmin). Artillery commanders such as Mian Ghausa were also Muslims. There were no forced conversions in his time. His wives Bibi Mohran, Gilbahar Begum retained their faith and so did his Hindu wives. He also employed and surrounded himself with astrologers and soothsayers in his court.

Ranjit Singh had also abolished the gurmata and provided significant patronage to the Udasi and Nirmala sect, leading to their prominence and control of Sikh religious affairs.

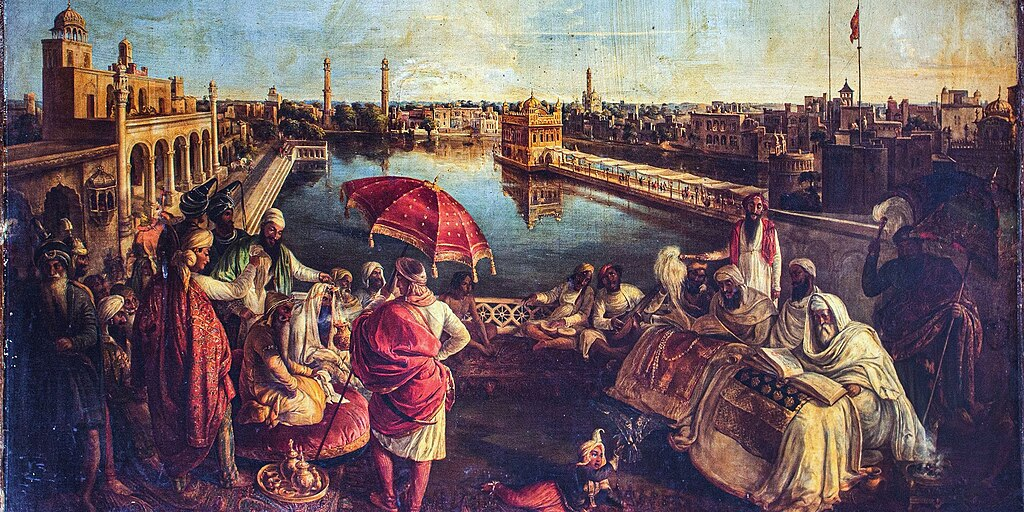
Maharaja Ranjit Singh listening to Guru Granth Sahib being recited near the Akal Takht and Golden Temple, Amritsar.

=== Khalsa Army ===
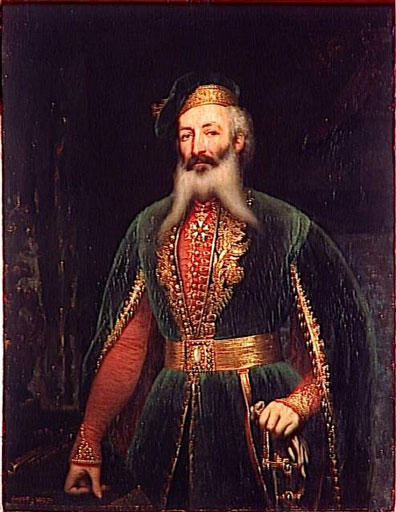
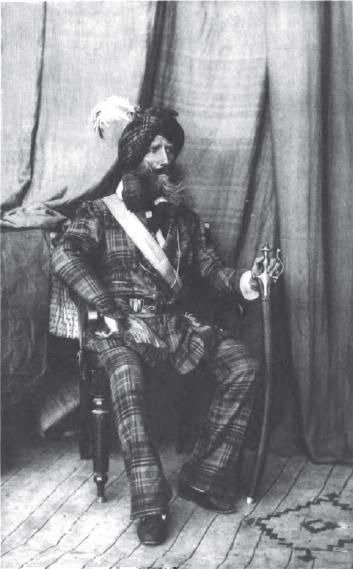
Ranjit Singh's army included Europeans. Left: Jean-François Allard, Right: Alexander Gardner

The army under Ranjit Singh was not limited to the Sikh community. The soldiers and troop officers included Sikhs, but also included Hindus, Muslims and Europeans. Hindu Brahmins and people of all creeds and castes served his army, while the composition in his government also reflected a religious diversity. His army included Polish, Russian, Spanish, Prussian and French officers. In 1835, as his relationship with the British warmed up, he hired a British officer named Foulkes. He also founded the Order of the Propitious Star of Punjab in 1837.

However, the Khalsa army of Ranjit Singh reflected the regional population, and as he grew his army, he dramatically increased the Rajputs and the Sikhs who became the predominant members of his army. In the Doaba region his army was composed of the Jat Sikhs, in Jammu and northern Indian hills it was Hindu Rajputs, while relatively more Muslims served his army in the Jhelum river area closer to Afghanistan than other major Panjab rivers.

==== Reforms ====
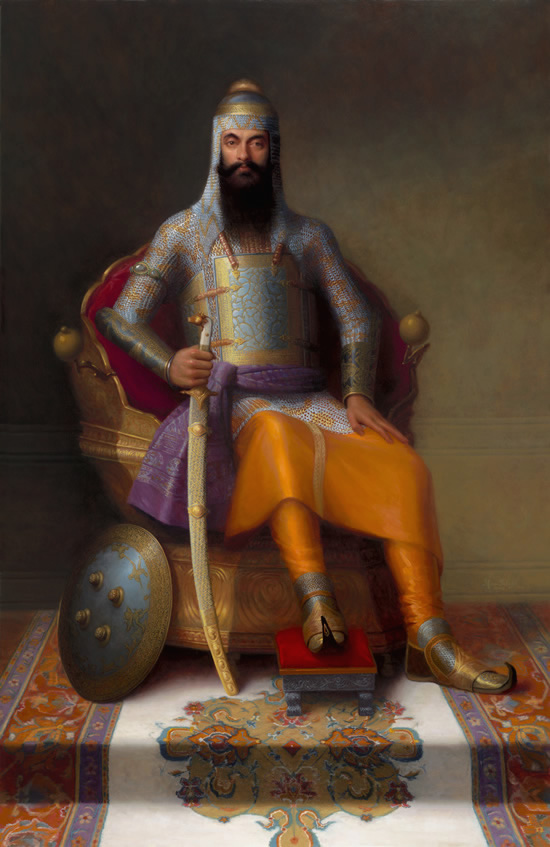
2009 portrait of Ranjit Singh wearing the Koh-i-noor diamond as an armlet.

Ranjit Singh changed and improved the training and organisation of his army. He reorganised responsibility and set performance standards in logistical efficiency in troop deployment, manoeuvre, and marksmanship. He reformed the staffing to emphasise steady fire over cavalry and guerrilla warfare, and improved the equipment and methods of war. The military system of Ranjit Singh combined the best of both old and new ideas. He strengthened the infantry and the artillery. He paid the members of the standing army from treasury, instead of the Mughal method of paying an army with local feudal levies.

While Ranjit Singh introduced reforms in terms of training and equipment of his military, he failed to reform the old jagirs (Ijra) system of Mughal middlemen. The jagirs system of state revenue collection involved certain individuals with political connections or inheritance promising a tribute (nazarana) to the ruler and thereby gaining administrative control over certain villages, with the right to force collect customs, excise and land tax at inconsistent and subjective rates from the peasants and merchants; they would keep a part of collected revenue and deliver the promised tribute value to the state. These jagirs maintained independent armed militia to extort taxes from the peasants and merchants, and the militia was prone to violence. This system of inconsistent taxation with arbitrary extortion by militia, continued the Mughal tradition of ill treatment of peasants and merchants throughout the Sikh Empire, and is evidenced by the complaints filed to Ranjit Singh by East India Company officials attempting to trade within different parts of the Sikh Empire.

According to historical records, Sunit Singh, Ranjit Singh's reforms focused on the military that would allow new conquests, but not towards the taxation system to end abuse, nor on introducing uniform laws in his state or improving internal trade and empowering the peasants and merchants. This failure to reform the jagirs-based taxation system and economy, in part led to a succession power struggle and a series of threats, internal divisions among Sikhs, major assassinations and coups in the Sikh Empire in the years immediately after the death of Ranjit Singh; an easy annexation of the remains of the Sikh Empire into British India followed, with the colonial officials offering the jagirs better terms and the right to keep the system intact.

==== Infrastructure investments ====
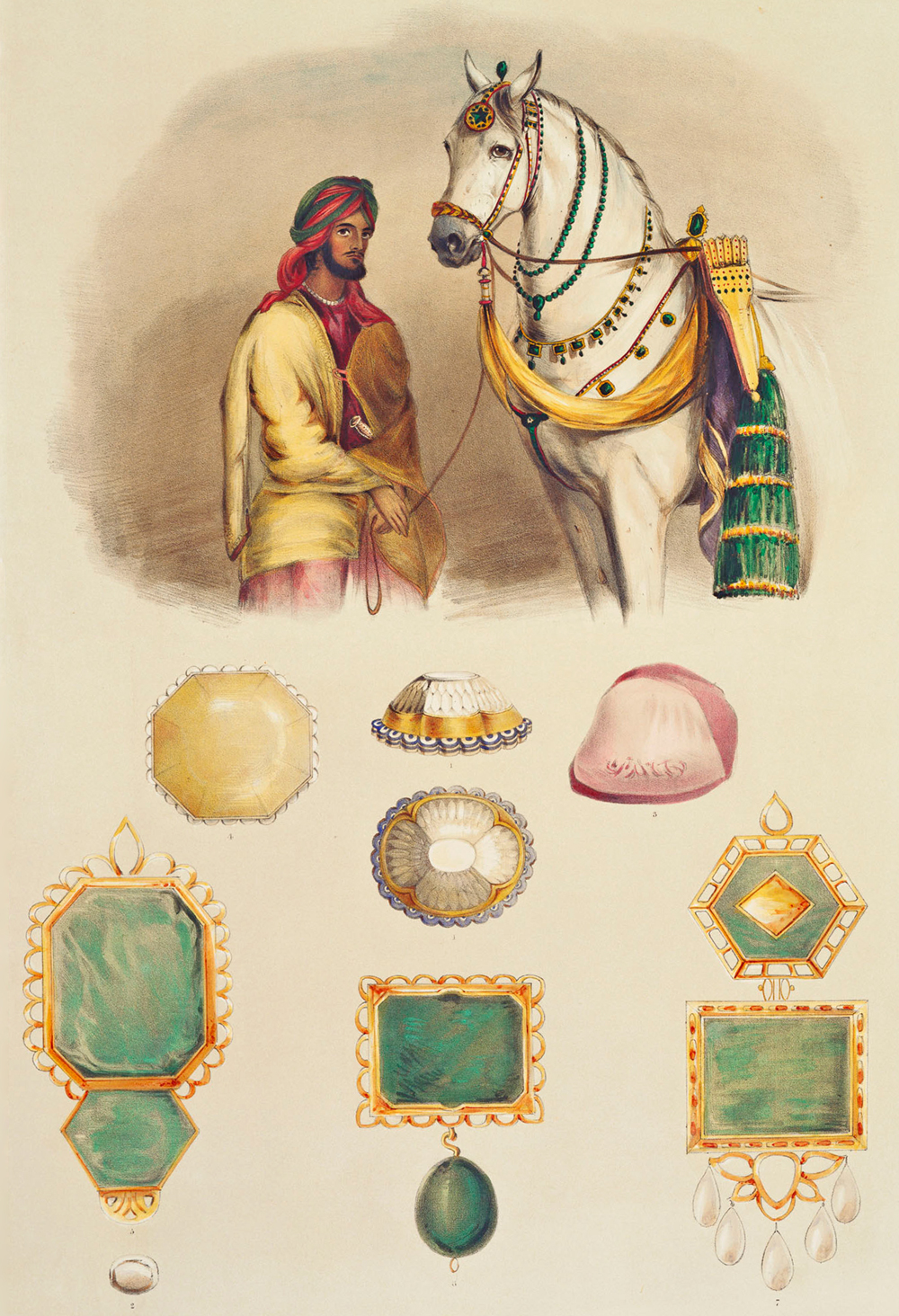
A lithograph by Emily Eden showing one of the favourite horses of Maharaja Ranjit Singh and his collection of jewels, including the Koh-i-Noor

Ranjit Singh ensured that Panjab manufactured and was self-sufficient in all weapons, equipment and munitions his army needed. His government invested in infrastructure in the 1800s and thereafter, established raw materials mines, cannon foundries, gunpowder and arms factories. Some of these operations were owned by the state, and others were operated by private Sikh operatives.

However, Ranjit Singh did not make major investments in other infrastructure such as irrigation canals to improve the productivity of land and roads. The prosperity in his Empire, in contrast to the Mughal-Sikh wars era, largely came from the improvement in the security situation, reduction in violence, reopened trade routes and greater freedom to conduct commerce.

=== Muslim accounts ===
19th century Muslim historians and scholars such as Shahamat Ali, who experienced the Sikh Empire first hand, presented a different view on Ranjit Singh's Empire and governance. According to Ali, Ranjit Singh's government was despotic, and he was a mean monarch in contrast to the Mughals. The initial momentum for the Empire building in these accounts is stated to be Ranjit Singh led Khalsa army's "insatiable appetite for plunder", their desire for "fresh cities to pillage", and eliminating the Mughal era "revenue intercepting intermediaries between the peasant-cultivator and the treasury".

According to Ishtiaq Ahmed, Muslims were subject to extreme prosecution under the rule of Ranjit Singh, just as Shi'a Muslims and Hindus were under the Sunni Afghan rulers before Kashmir became part of his Sikh Empire. Bikramjit Hasrat describes Ranjit Singh as a "benevolent despot". The Muslim accounts of Ranjit Singh's rule were questioned by Sikh historians of the same era. For example, Ratan Singh Bhangu in 1841 wrote that these accounts were not accurate, and according to Anne Murphy, he remarked, "when would a Musalman praise the Sikhs?" In contrast, the colonial era British military officer Hugh Pearse in 1898 criticised Ranjit Singh's rule, as one founded on "violence, treachery and blood". Sohan Seetal disagrees with this account and states that Ranjit Singh had encouraged his army to respond with a "tit for tat" against the enemy, violence for violence, blood for blood, plunder for plunder.

=== Decline ===
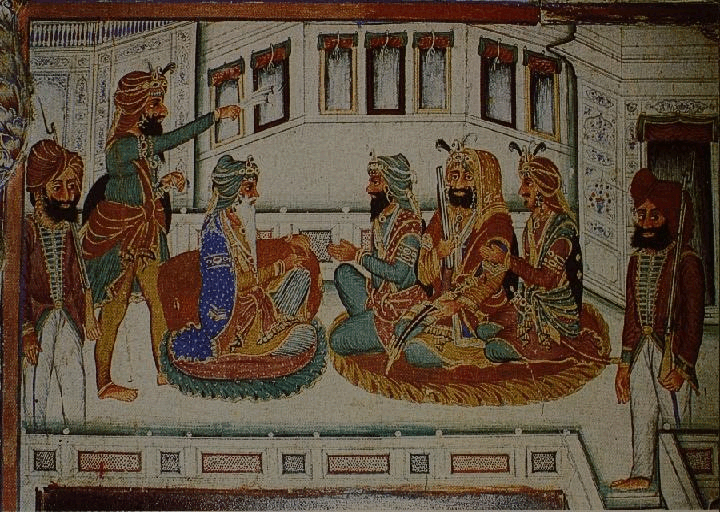
Fresco of Maharaja Ranjit Singh meeting with his potential heirs

Singh made his empire and the Sikhs a strong political force, for which he is deeply admired and revered in Sikhism. After his death, the empire failed to establish a lasting structure for Sikh government or stable succession, and the Sikh Empire began to decline. The British and Sikh Empire fought two Anglo-Sikh wars with the second ending the reign of the Sikh Empire. Sikhism itself did not decline.

Clive Dewey has argued that the decline of the empire after Singh's death owes much to the jagir-based economic and taxation system which he inherited from the Mughals and retained. After his death, a fight to control the tax spoils emerged, leading to a power struggle among the nobles and his family from different wives. This struggle ended with a rapid series of palace coups and assassinations of his descendants, and eventually the annexation of the Sikh Empire by the British.

== Personal life ==
=== Wives ===
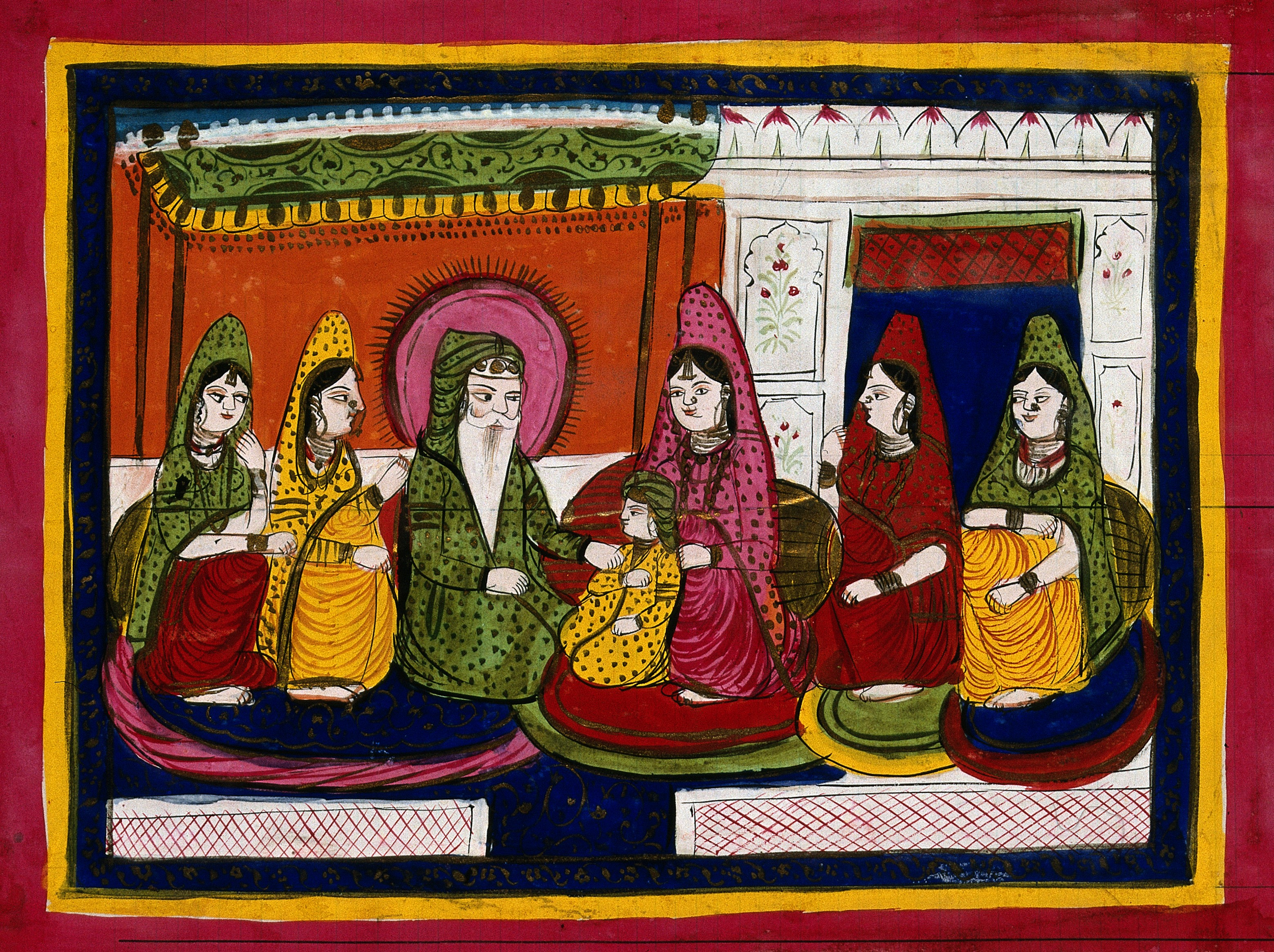
Maharaja Ranjit Singh with some of his wives.

Ranjit Singh married many times, in various ceremonies, and had twenty wives. Sir Lepel Griffin, however, provides a list of just sixteen wives and their pension list. Most of his marriages were performed through chādar andāz. Some scholars note that the information on Ranjit Singh's marriages is unclear, and there is evidence that he had many concubines. Dr. Priya Atwal presents an official list of Ranjit Singh's thirty wives. The women married through chādar andāzī were noted as concubines and were known as the lesser title of Rani (queen). While Mehtab Kaur and Datar Kaur officially bore the title of Maharani (high queen), according to Sohan Lal Suri, Datar Kaur was the queen consort and the main wife of the Maharaja. She was also his favorite wife. Throughout her life was referred to as Sarkar Rani. After her death, the title was held by Ranjit's youngest widow Jind Kaur. According to Khushwant Singh in an 1889 interview with the French journal Le Voltaire, his son Dalip (Duleep) Singh remarked, "I am the son of one of my father's forty-six wives." Dr. Priya Atwal notes that Ranjit Singh and his heirs entered a total of 46 marriages. But Ranjit Singh was known not to be a "rash sensualist" and commanded unusual respect in the eyes of others. Faqir Sayyid Vaḥiduddin states: "If there was one thing in which Ranjit Singh failed to excel or even equal the average monarch of oriental history, it was the size of his harem." George Keene noted, "In hundreds and in thousands the orderly crowds stream on. Not a bough is broken off a wayside tree, not a rude remark to a woman".

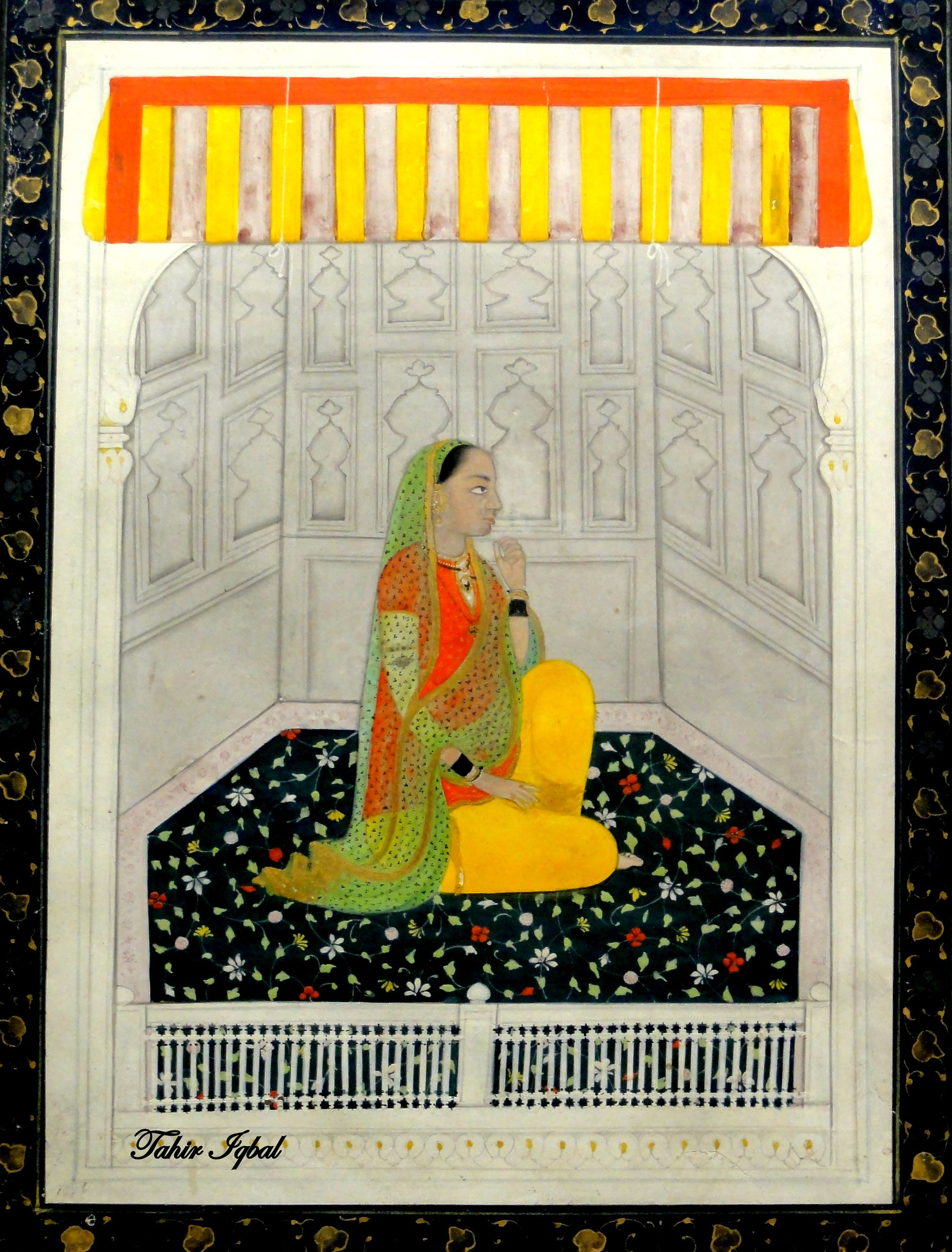
Miniature painting of Moran Sarkar, a Muslim nautch dancer of the court Ranjit Singh and a claimed wife of his

In 1802, Ranjit Singh married Moran Sarkar, a Muslim nautch girl, for which he was admonished by Akal Takht but later forgiven. Iqbal Qaiser and Manveen Sandhu make alternative accounts of the relationship between Moran and the Maharaja; the former states they never married, while the latter states that they married. Court chronicler, Sohan Lal Suri makes no mention of Moran's marriage to the Maharaja or coins being struck in her name. Bibi Moran spent the rest of life in Pathankot. Duleep Singh makes a list of his father's queens which also does not mention Bibi Moran.

=== Issue ===
==== Sons ====
- Kharak Singh (22 February 1801 – 5 November 1840) was the eldest and the favorite of Ranjit Singh from his second wife, Datar Kaur. He succeeded his father as the Maharaja.
- Ishar Singh (1804–1805) son of his first wife, Mehtab Kaur. This prince died in infancy.
- Sher Singh (4 December 1807 – 15 September 1843) was the elder of the twins of Mehtab Kaur. He briefly became the Maharaja of the Sikh Empire.
- Tara Singh (4 December 1807 – 1859) younger of the twins born of Mehtab Kaur.
- Multana Singh (1819–1846) son of Ratan Kaur.
- Kashmira Singh (1821–1844) son of Daya Kaur.
- Pashaura Singh (1821–1845) younger son of Daya Kaur.
- Duleep Singh (4 September 1838 – 22 October 1893), the last Maharaja of the Sikh Empire. Ranjit Singh's youngest son, the only child of Jind Kaur.

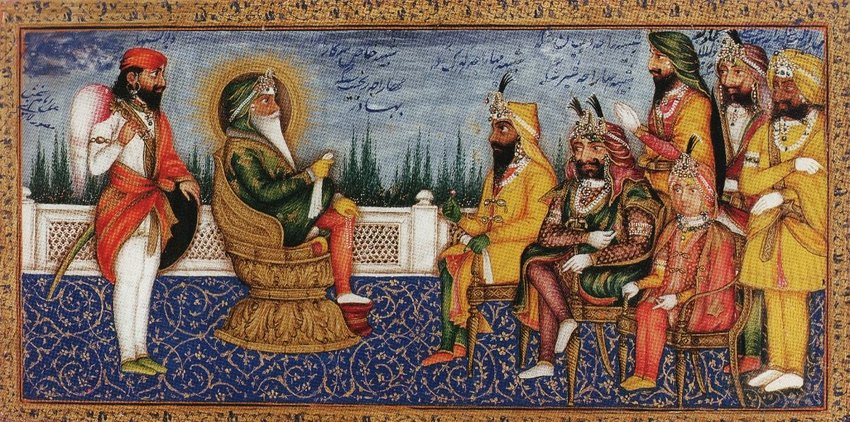
Maharaja Ranjit Singh in Darbar with sons and officials. Signed by Imam Bakhsh

According to the pedigree table and Duleep Singh's diaries that he kept towards the end of his life another son Fateh Singh was born to Mai Nakain, who died in infancy. According to Henry Edward Fane only Datar Kaur and Jind Kaur's sons are Ranjit Singh's biological sons.

It is said that Ishar Singh was not the biological son of Mehtab Kaur and Ranjit Singh, but only procured by Mehtab Kaur and presented to Ranjit Singh who accepted him as his son. Tara Singh and Sher Singh had similar rumours, it is said that Sher Singh was the son of a chintz weaver, Nahala and Tara Singh was the son of Manki, a servant in the household of Sada Kaur. Henry Edward Fane, the nephew and aide-de-camp to the Commander-in-Chief, India, General Sir Henry Fane, who spent several days in Ranjit Singh's company, reported, "Though reported to be the Maharaja's son, Sher Singh's father has never thoroughly acknowledged him, though his mother always insisted on his being so. A brother of Sher, Tara Singh by the same mother, has been even worse treated than himself, not being permitted to appear at court, and no office given him, either of profit or honour."

Multana Singh, Kashmira Singh and Pashaura Singh were sons of the two widows of Sahib Singh, Daya Kaur and Ratan Kaur, whom Ranjit Singh took under his protection and married. These sons, are said to be, not biologically born to the queens and only procured and later presented to and accepted by Ranjit Singh as his sons.

==== Daughters ====
It is unknown how many daughters were fathered by Ranjit Singh. The only known reference to Ranjit Singh fathering daughters is a handwritten note by Duleep Singh which records that four daughters were born to his father. The names of these four daughters was not written but the names of their mothers were, namely Jagdeo and Aso Sircar, who bore one daughter each, and Hurdsir, who bore two daughters. Dr. Priya Atwal notes that the daughters could have been adopted as it was common for nobility to adopt children.

== Death ==
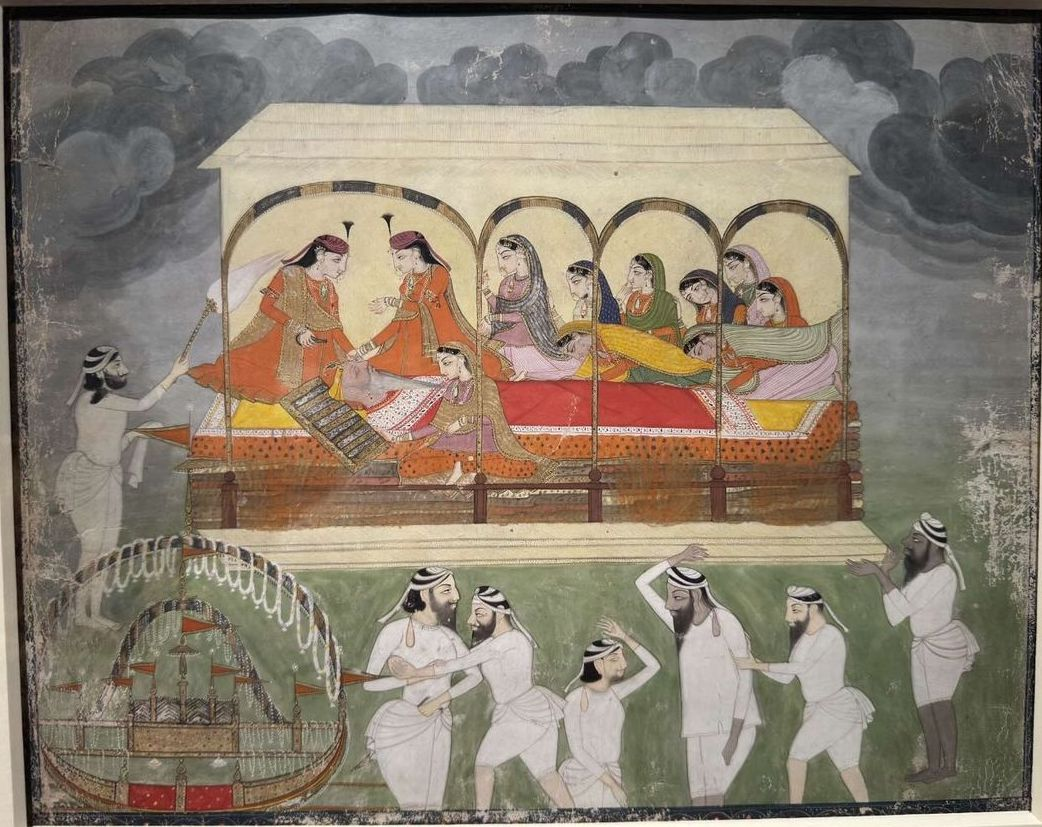
Maharaja Ranjit Singh's funeral. ca. 1840

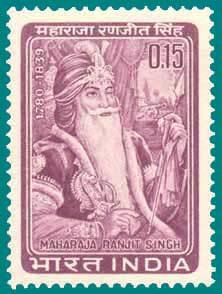
Postage stamp Commemoration Maharaja Ranjit Singh, 1966

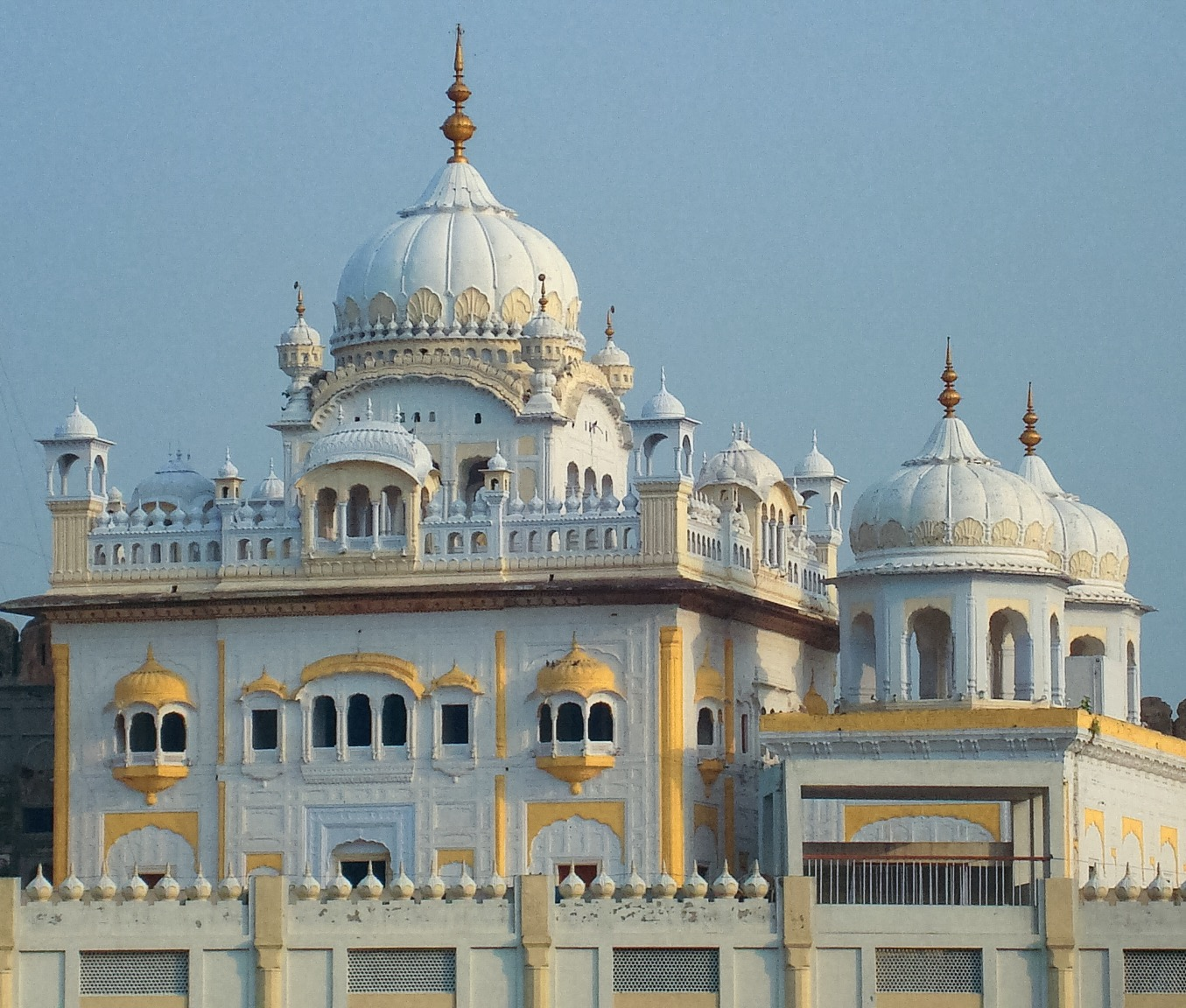
The Samadhi of Ranjit Singh is located in Lahore, Pakistan, adjacent to the iconic Badshahi Mosque.

In the 1830s, Ranjit Singh suffered from numerous health complications as well as a stroke, which some historical records attribute to alcoholism and a failing liver. According to the chronicles of Ranjit Singh's court historians and the Europeans who visited him, Ranjit Singh took to alcohol and opium, habits that intensified in the later decades of his life. He died in his sleep on 27 June 1839. According to William Dalrymple, Ranjit Singh had been washed with water from the Ganges, paid homage to the Guru Granth Sahib, and was fixated on an image of Vishnu and Lakshmi just before his death.

Four of his Hindu wives- Mehtab Devi (Guddan Sahiba), daughter of Raja Sansar Chand, Rani Har Devi, the daughter of Chaudhri Ram, a Saleria Rajput, Rani Raj Devi, daughter of Padma Rajput and Rani Rajno Kanwar, daughter of Sand Bhari along with seven Hindu concubines with royal titles committed sati by voluntarily placing themselves onto his funeral pyre as an act of devotion.

== Character ==
He was short in stature, unattractive, never schooled, and did not learn to read or write anything beyond the Gurmukhi alphabet. However, he was trained at home in horse riding, musketry and other martial arts.

Singh is remembered for uniting Sikhs and founding the prosperous Sikh Empire. He is also remembered for his conquests and building a well-trained, self-sufficient Khalsa army to protect the empire. He amassed considerable wealth, including gaining the possession of the Koh-i-Noor diamond from Shuja Shah Durrani of Afghanistan, which he left to Jagannath Temple in Puri, Odisha in 1839.

== Legacy ==
=== Gurdwaras ===
Perhaps Singh's most lasting legacy was the restoration and expansion of the Harmandir Sahib, the most revered Gurudwara of the Sikhs, which is now known popularly as the "Golden Temple". Much of the present decoration at the Harmandir Sahib, in the form of gilding and marblework, was introduced under the patronage of Singh, who also sponsored protective walls and a water supply system to strengthen security and operations related to the temple. He also directed the construction of two of the most sacred Sikh temples, being the birthplace and place of assassination of Guru Gobind Singh — Takht Sri Patna Sahib and Takht Sri Hazur Sahib, respectively. The nine-storey tower of Gurdwara Baba Atal was constructed during his reign.

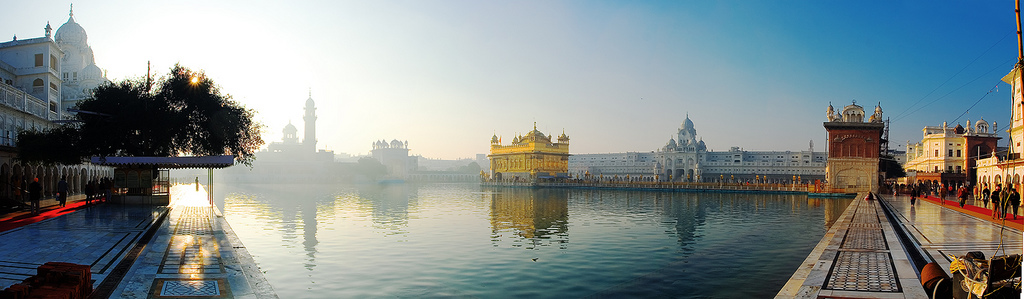
The Harmandir Sahib (also known as the Golden Temple) was completely renovated by Maharaja Ranjit Singh.

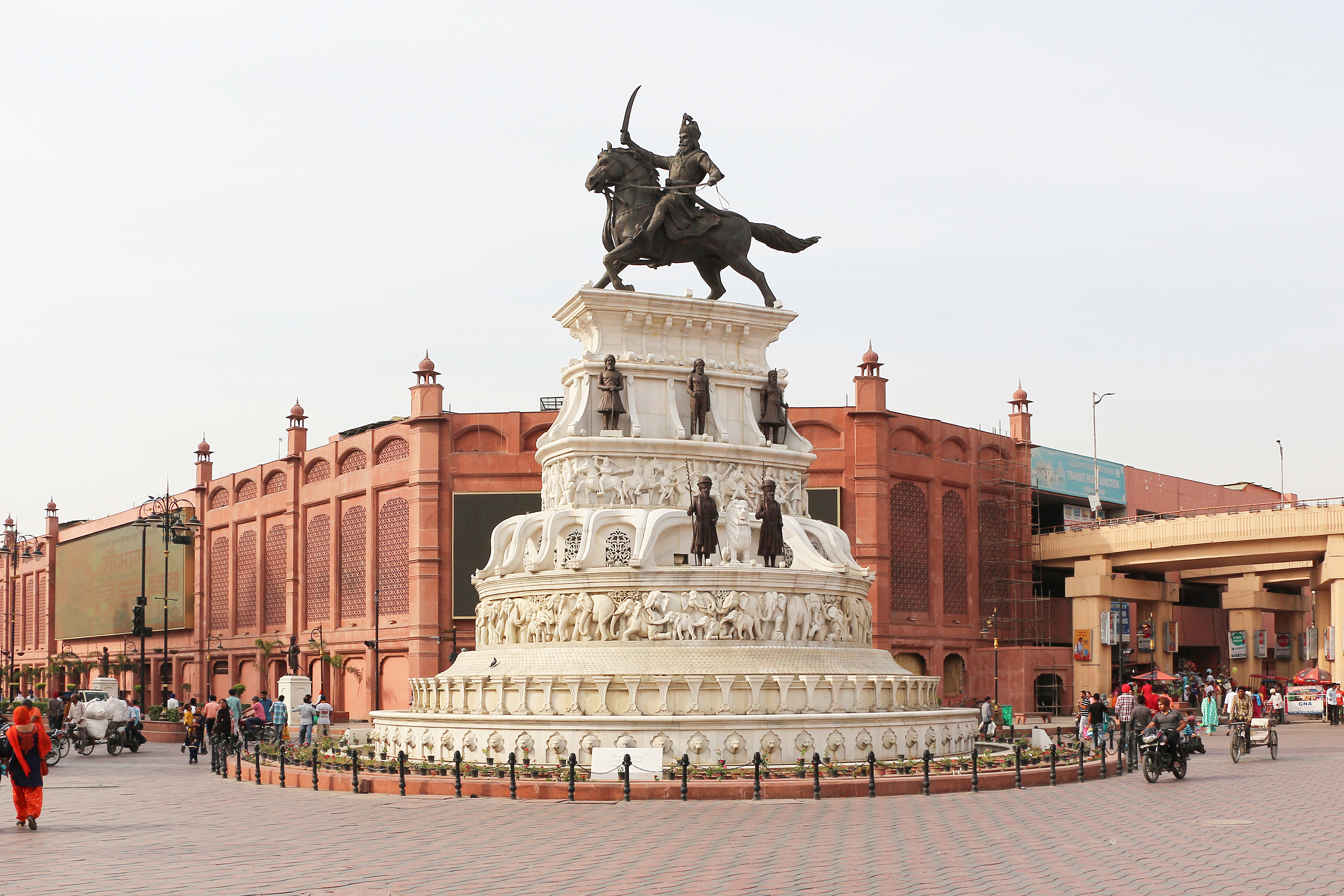
Statue of Ranjit Singh in Amritsar.

=== Memorials and museums ===
- Samadhi of Ranjit Singh in Lahore, Pakistan, marks the place where Singh was cremated, and four of his queens and seven concubines committed sati.
- On 20 August 2003, a 22-foot-tall bronze statue of Singh was installed in the Parliament of India.
- A museum at Ram Bagh Palace in Amritsar contains objects related to Singh, including arms and armour, paintings, coins, manuscripts, and jewellery. Singh had spent much time at the palace in which it is situated, where a garden was laid out in 1818.
- On 27 June 2019, a nine-foot bronze statue of Singh was unveiled at the Haveli Maharani Jindan, Lahore Fort at his 180th death anniversary. It has been vandalised several times since, specifically by members of the Tehreek-e-Labbaik Pakistan.

=== Exhibitions ===
- Ranjit Singh: Sikh, Warrior, King (The Wallace Collection, London; 10 April–20 October 2024) – co-curated by the Wallace Collection's director, Xavier Bray, and scholar of Sikh art, Davinder Singh Toor.

=== Crafts ===
In 1783, Ranjit Singh established a crafts colony of Thatheras near Amritsar and encouraged skilled metal crafters from Kashmir to settle in Jandiala Guru. In the year 2014, this traditional craft of making brass and copper products was enlisted on the List of Intangible Cultural Heritage by UNESCO. The Government of Punjab is now working under Project Virasat to revive this craft.

=== Recognition ===
In 2020, Ranjit Singh was named as "Greatest Leader of All Time" in a poll conducted by 'BBC World Histories Magazine'.

== In popular culture ==
- Maharaja Ranjit Singh, a documentary film directed by Prem Prakash covers his rise to power and his reign. It was produced by the Government of India's Films Division.
- Saeed Jaffrey portrayed Maharaja Ranjit Singh in the 1974 French series, Le Soleil se Lève à L'est (The Sun Rises in the East) based on lives of Jean-François Allard and Jean-Baptiste Ventura.
- In 2010, a TV series titled Maharaja Ranjit Singh aired on DD National based on his life which was produced by Raj Babbar's Babbar Films Private Limited. He was portrayed by Ejlal Ali Khan.
- Maharaja: The Story of Ranjit Singh (2010) is an Indian Punjabi-language animated film directed by Amarjit Virdi.
- A teenage Ranjit was portrayed by Damanpreet Singh in the 2017 TV series titled Sher-e-Punjab: Maharaja Ranjit Singh. It aired on Life OK produced by Contiloe Entertainment.

== See also ==
- Baradari of Ranjit Singh
- History of Punjab
- Charat Singh
- List of generals of Ranjit Singh
- Battle of Balakot

== Bibliography ==
- Jacques, Tony (2006). Dictionary of Battles and Sieges: A Guide to 8,500 Battles from Antiquity Through the Twenty-first Century. Westport: Greenwood Press. p. 419. ISBN 978-0-313-33536-5.
- Heath, Ian (2005). The Sikh Army 1799–1849. Oxford: Osprey Publishing (UK). ISBN 1-84176-777-8.
- Lafont, Jean-Marie Maharaja Ranjit Singh, Lord of the Five Rivers. Oxford: Oxford University Press, 2002 ISBN 0-19-566111-7
- Marshall, Julie G. (2005), Britain and Tibet 1765–1947: a select annotated bibliography of British relations with Tibet and the Himalayan states including Nepal, Sikkim and Bhutan (Revised and Updated to 2003 ed.), London: Routledge, ISBN 978-0-415-33647-5
- Sandhawalia, Preminder Singh Noblemen and Kinsmen: history of a Sikh family. New Delhi: Munshiram Manoharlal, 1999 ISBN 81-215-0914-9
- Waheeduddin, Fakir Syed The Real Ranjit Singh; 2nd ed. Patiala: Punjabi University, 1981 ISBN 81-7380-778-7 (First ed. published 1965 Pakistan).
- Griffin, Sir Lepel Henry (1909). Chiefs and Families of Note in the Punjab. The National Archives: Civil and Military Gazette Press. ISBN 978-8175365155. Archived from the original on 4 March 2016.

Preceded by Charat Singh	Leader of the Sukerchakia Misl; 1792–1801	Succeeded by None
Preceded by None	Maharaja of the Sikh Empire; 1801–1839	Succeeded by Kharak Singh
