= Urdu ghazal =

Literary form

Urdu literature اردو ادب
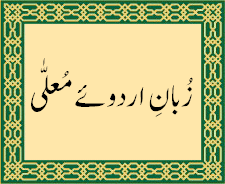

Urdu literature
- By category Urdu language Rekhta

Major figures
- Amir Khusrau - Wali Dakhani - Mir Taqi Mir - Ghalib - Abdul Haq - Muhammad Iqbal

Urdu writers
- Writers – Novelists – Poets

Forms
- Ghazal - Dastangoi - Nazm – Fiction

Institutions
- Anjuman-i Taraqqi-i Urdu; Urdu movement Literary Prizes

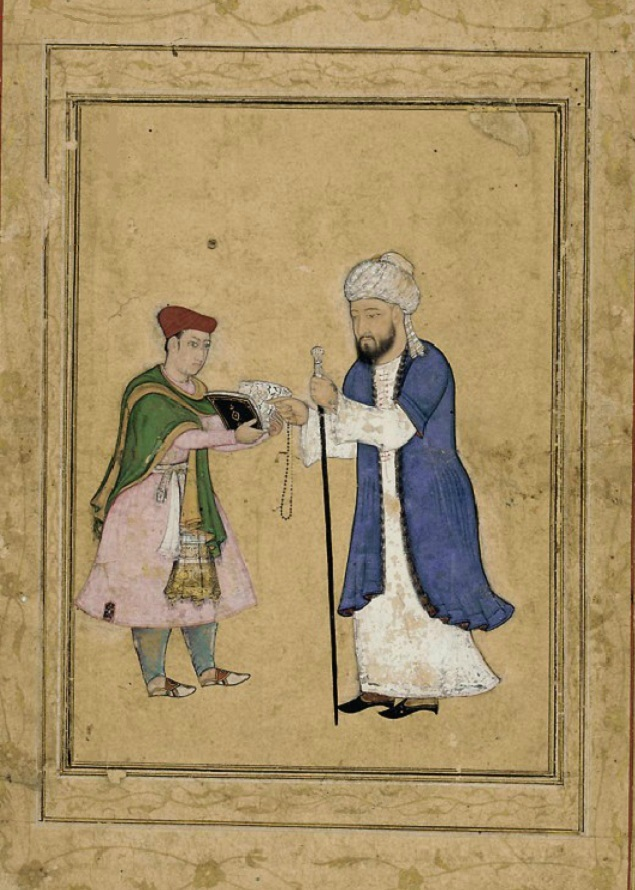
Khwaja Hafiz recites his poetry in the 17th century.

The Urdu ghazal is a literary form of the ghazal-poetry unique to the Indian subcontinent, written in the Urdu standard of the Hindostani language. It is commonly asserted that the ghazal spread to South Asia from the influence of Sufi mystics in the Delhi Sultanate.

A ghazal is composed of ashaar, which are similar to couplets, that rhyme in a pattern of AA BA CA DA EA (and so on), with each individual she'r (couplet) typically presenting a complete idea not necessarily related to the rest of the poem. They are often described as being individual pearls that make up a united necklace.

Classically, the ghazal inhabits the consciousness of a passionate, desperate lover, wherein deeper reflections of life are found in the audience's awareness of what some commentators and historians call "The Ghazal Universe", which can be described as a store of characters, settings, and other tropes the genre employs to create meaning.

== Craft Characteristics of an Urdu Ghazal ==
=== She'r ===
A ghazal is composed of five or more ashaar (singular she'r), which are complete texts even when pulled from the rest of the ghazal. In the vast majority of ghazals, there is not logical connection or flow between ashaar in terms of content or theme.

They are often described as couplets by Western audiences and critics, yet using the word "couplet" to describe a she'r is not entirely accurate, as ghazals do not have the rhyme scheme of couplets, nor are they a Western poetic form.

A she'r will often contains what Agha Shahid Ali described as "voltas" or "turns" from the first misra (line) to the second, where the intention of the poet is to surprise the reader or invert expectations.

The matla is the first she'r of a ghazal. In this she'r, the poet established the radif, qaafiya, and beher (meter) that the rest of the ghazal will follow.

The maqta is the final she'r of a ghazal, where the poet will often include their Takhallus. These ashaar tend to be more personal by the poet referring to themselves, diverting from the ghazal's universal and self-transcendent qualities.

=== Beher (Meter) ===
Meter is considered intrinsic to the craft, with some classical poets being mocked for crafting meter incorrectly. Meter for Urdu is completely unlike meter in English poetry, as scansion of an Urdu ghazal is based upon rules in Arabic scansion. The distinction between long and short syllables is not based on vowel length, like it is in English poetry scansion. Instead, a long syllable generally contains two letters, while a short syllable generally contains one.

There are many special rules that poets employ, such as the do chashmi he character, which denotes aspiration in the Nastaliq script, being metrically invisible.

Metrical feet (rukn) are represented by mnemonic words called afaail, which both emulate and name the metrical foot. For example, maf'uulan denotes three long syllables in a metrical foot, while fa'lun denotes two long syllables.

=== Rhyme ===
The Urdu ghazal makes use of two main rhymes: the radif and qaafiya. The radif is a repeating refrain consisting of a single word or short phrase that ends every second line in the ghazal. However, in the matla, the first she'r of a ghazal, the radif will end both lines of the she'r.

The qaafiya is a rhyming syllable that precedes the radif.

In this ghazal by Mir Taqi Mir, the qaafiya is bolded and the radif is underlined:

hastī apnī habāb kī sī hai

ye numā.ish sarāb kī sī hai

nāzukī us ke lab kī kyā kahiye

pañkhuḌī ik gulāb kī sī hai

chashm-e-dil khol is bhī aalam par

yaañ kī auqāt ḳhvāb kī sī hai

baar baar us ke dar pe jaatā huuñ

hālat ab iztirāb kī sī hai

nuqta-e-ḳhāl se tirā abrū

bait ik intiḳhāb kī sī hai

== History of the Urdu Ghazal ==
=== Emergence of Urdu Ghazal ===
Literature written in Hindi-Urdu was not common prior to the 1700s. In North India, rich literary cultures existed in Awadhi and Brajbhasha, with earliest Awadhi texts dating to the 14th century. In Delhi, poets wrote in Persian, while Rekhta/Hindvi (what is now recognizable as Hindi-Urdu) did not have the same literary recognition.

In the 17th century, Muhammad Quli Qutb Shah, the founder of Hyderabad, composed ghazal in Persian, Urdu, and Telugu. He also began a tradition of arts patronage and promoted Hyderabad as a literary city of Urdu in Southern India.

Critic and Scholar Shamsur Rahman Faruqi notes that one story claims the poet Wali was one of the first to draw from the store of Persian literary culture to write ghazal in Hindi-Urdu.

=== Classical Period ===
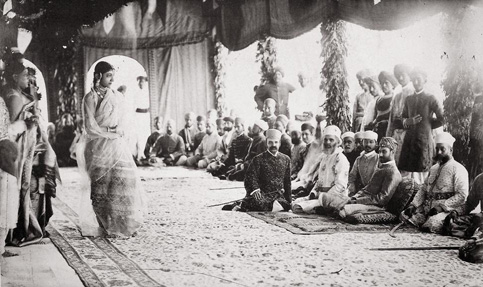
Mushaira in Hyderabad during the 19th century.

The poet Mir Taqi Mir is often lauded as ushering in a "Golden Age" of Urdu ghazal poetry in the early 18th century by mastering the blend of Persian influences with the common and idiomatic Urdu. Another classical poet, Mirza Muhammad Rafi Sauda is notable for his poetry being socially aware, and sometimes even satirical.

During this era, poets made a living by attracting the financial patronage of the courts. The Oudh State gained a reputation for being one of the most generous, leading to many poets flocking to Lucknow, Farrukhabad, and Faizabad.

In Delhi, the Red Fort served as both a location where mushaira were hosted, and as an institution that provided patronage to poets such as Ghalib, Zauq, Dagh, and Momin.

=== 1857 ===
The literary establishment of Delhi was split by the Indian Rebellion of 1857, as Ustad Zauq and Maulvi Muhammad Baqar supported the uprising, believing it would restore the Mughal Court to glory. Both were later hung by the British for treason.

The last Mughal emperor, Bahadur Shah Zafar, wrote this verse while imprisoned by the British after the uprising ended:

Sabhi jagah matam-e-sakht hai, kaho kaisi gardish-e-bakht hai

Na wo taj hai na wo takht hai na wo shah hai na dayar hai

Everywhere there is the lament and wails of mourning, how terrible is the turn of fate

Neither the crown, nor the throne, nor the emperor or the kingdom remains

In the aftermath of the rebellion, the old institutions of patronage, ustads, and mushaira ended.

=== Modernism and the Aligarh Movement ===
In the late 19th century, reform movements of Urdu's literary landscape were influenced by the impacts of British colonialism. One notable leader in the modernist Islamic reform movement was Altaf Hussain Hali, who believed the ghazal to be outdated and limited in its particular rules of craft. Syed Ahmad Khan argued that Urdu literature should be remodeled after the English forms and conventions. While the classical ghazal embraced ambiguity, emotional hyperbole, and wordplay, the Aligarh Movement proposed that literature should be simple, clear, and modern.

=== Contemporary literary scene ===
One of the largest organizations dedicated to preserving the Urdu ghazal is Rekhta Foundation, which has digitized over 90,000 Urdu literary works, including ghazal. For the past five years, it has hosted the annual event Jashn-e-Rekhta.

Bollywood has also adapted the Urdu ghazal for movie audience, creating a sub-genre called Filmi-ghazal. Movies such as Umrao Jaan (1981 film) and The Chess Players (film) have also portrayed the cultural decadence associated with ghazal.

Women writers also began to receive recognition for writing ghazal after carving space for themselves during the 1940s in the masculine, male-dominated mushaira. Writers such as Fahmida Riaz and Kishwar Naheed have expanded the ghazal to explore feminist perspectives and speak on issues in society.

Sukhan, a concert of Urdu poetry and Hindustani music, is playing a pivotal role in expanding Urdu poetry and literature in the Deccan region of India, especially Maharashtra, while also reviving traditional music forms like ghazal and qawwali, and literary forms like daastan-goi. The concert is conceptualised and directed by Om Bhutkar Maghloob, an actor and a poet who crafts his verses in the traditional forms of ghazal and nazm.

== Performance ==
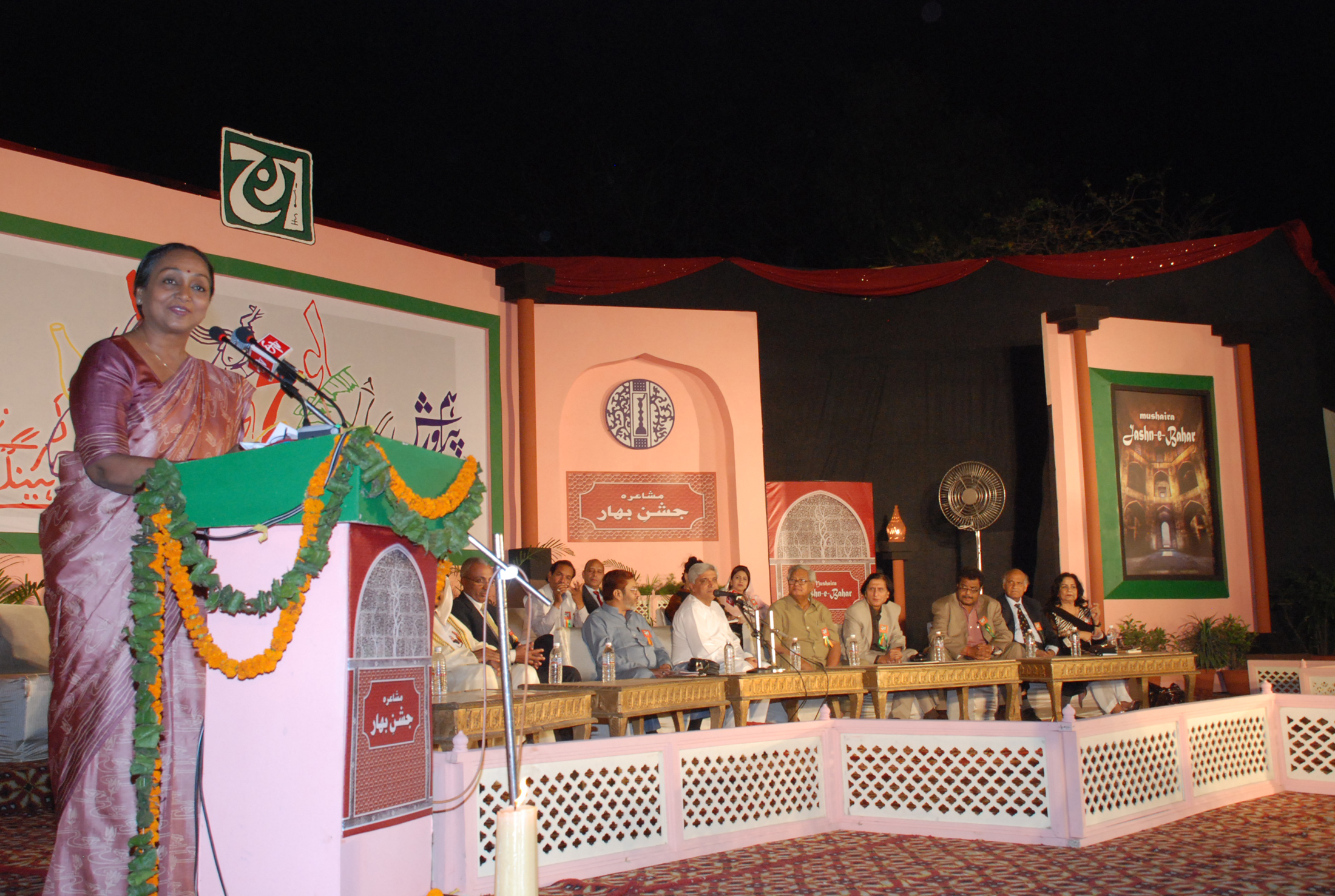
The Mushaira Jashn-e-Bahar in New Delhi, 2011.

The Urdu ghazal can be sung with music in the Sufi Qawalli tradition, which is popular in South Asia. They are also commonly sung outside of Sufi shrines called Dargah. Another way to recite ghazal is tarannum, which is a mix of heightened speaking and low-key singing, often described as chanting.

Ghazal are traditionally performed at Mushaira, literary events that were historically held in the Mughal Courts, but in current times can be anywhere. At a mushaira, the order of poets who read their poems is in order from novice to master. The Mushaira is also considered to be a professional workshop, where poets can improve their ghazal after seeing how the audience reacts to certain parts.

A group of poets and poetry admirers is called a Mehfil that historically and culturally gathers around like an audience to listen to the poet and to show appreciation to the performance.

== Tropes ==
The Urdu ghazal makes use of a store of common characters, settings, images, and metaphors that inform both readers and poets of how to navigate the aforementioned ghazal universe. These tropes have been cultivated for hundreds of years and are meant to deeply resonate with listeners of the ghazal, invoking their expectations of meaning.

Because the ghazal's ashaar are only two lines long, a reader's understanding comes not just from reading a single she'r, but also from considering that she'r in the context of its relation to pre-established ideas in the ghazal tradition. Readers commonly navigate new she'r by comparing them to other she'r and reflecting upon similarities or divergences.

=== Characters ===
The characters of the ghazal create expectations within the audience of how the speaker and addressees of the ghazal might act. The central characters are implicated in the classic love situation of the lover pursuing the beloved, while the other secondary characters mostly add to the lover's troubles.

- The Lover (Aashiq) is standard "narrator" of the ghazal who pursues their beloved (mehboob).
- The Beloved (Mehboob)is aashiq's object of desire. The gender of the mehboob is universal.
- The Rival competes with the lover for attention of the beloved.
- The Advisor attempts to console the lover, yet typically adds to his suffering with smug or unsympathetic advice.
- The Religious Figure claims piety and righteousness yet indulges in alcohol or other sins

=== Settings ===
There are common settings wherein ghazals take place that usually shape the circumstances of the ghazal's meaning.

- The Garden (bagh), where the poet often takes on the personage of the bulbul, a songbird indigenous to the Middle East and South Asia. Traditionally, this is a metaphor expressing desire for union with the divine.

Hoon garmi-i-nishat-i-tasavvur se naghma sanj

Main andalib-i-gulshan-i-na afridah hoon

- Ghalib

I sing from the warmth of the passionate joy of thought

I am the bulbul of a garden not yet created

- The Tavern (me'khana), where a wine-bearer (saqi) invites the speaker to deeper and deeper stages of intoxication. The wine-bearer is often a teenage boy or young man who is flirtatious with the speaker. The wine does not refer to sensual intoxication, instead opening up themes of spiritual enlightenment and the Sufi concept of self-annihilation through Fana (Sufism).

=== Classic Images and Metaphors ===
The ghazal is notable for its exaggerated, far-fetched, and elevated imagery with highly figurative language.

- Moth and Candle (Shama aur parvana): The moth is typically described as enraptured by the glow of the candle, circling it to the point of being incinerated. This image can be used as a metaphor to present the lover's obsession with the beloved, and his willingness to destroy himself for union.
- The rose (gul) and bulbul: Poets often remark on the smile of the rose, or of its relation to the season of love, where the world blooms into spring.
- Arrows: In the same way an animal wounded by an arrow would run around a desert in a fit of passion, so too does the lover wander aimlessly in their obsession of the beloved. Often, the lover is described as physically wounded by the beloved's indifferent cruelty, invoking images of battle.
- Medical: Poems often relate existential pain to having a medicinal cure, often invoked through the words dard or ilaaj (cure, medicical treatment). This she'r by Ghalib invokes medicinal imagery as well as the aforementioned candle:

ġham-e-hastī kā 'asad' kis se ho juz marg ilaaj sham.a har rañg meñ jaltī hai sahar hote tak Asad, what can cure the grief of existence, except dying? The candle is obliged to burn before extinguishing at dawn.

- Layla and Majnun: This classic Persian romance is often referencing in ghazal, with the poet comparing themselves to Majnun's state of mind in the tale. In the story, Majnun wanders the desert, where he lives an ascetic life and composes verses declaring his love for Layla. Ghazal poets frequently use this story as a simile or reference point to portray their love as similarly obsessive and pure. Ghazal poets frequently use this story as a simile or reference point to portray their love as similarly obsessive and pure. Urdu ghazal is a form of lyrical poetry that originated in the Urdu language during the Mughal Empire. It consists of rhyming couplets, with each line sharing the same meter.

== Themes ==
=== Love ('ishq) ===
A common theme of the ghazal is of the tortured ('ashiq) pursuing an indifferent or cruel beloved (mehboob). The gender of both the speaker and the addressee of a ghazal can be heterosexual, homoerotic, or fluid and indeterminate. Through this ambiguity of personhood, the beloved is an ideal of love where deeper reflections of life, death, and god can be expressed.

Therefore, love in the ghazal is not only that of factual human love affairs (ishq-e-mijazi), but also of a divine union and mystical transcendence (ishq-e-haqaqi).

=== Sufism ===
Sufi thought first entered the ghazal genre in the Persian language before eventually entering in Urdu as well. In the ghazal, themes of love and union with a lover simultaneously refer to union with the divine in a mystical Islamic tradition. Love for a Sufi is the presence of God, not the presence of physical passion. Many poets have written she'r which parody orthodox religious puritans, as in this she'r of Ghalib:

What! the Waiz standing aface the tavern door!

But, believe me, Ghalib, I did see him stealing in as I departed

kahāñ mai-ḳhāne kā darvāza 'ġhālib' aur kahāñ vaa.iz

par itnā jānte haiñ kal vo jaatā thā ki ham nikle

In this motif of the ghazal, the poets are often indifferent to their own implication of running into the religious figures at the tavern.

Another motif present in the ghazal is unbounded love for the beloved and destruction of self that is parallel to the Sufi practice of fana.

=== Pain and Longing ===
The ghazal as a genre embraces the concealment or rejection of one's love, viewing this as an intensification of feeling. The poet will often depict their self in positions of destitution with tattered clothing, or with stones being thrown at them. A key theme is that the beloved and lover are never united.

In this she'r by Ghalib, he invokes eternal longing and pain from the story of Layla and Majnun:

maiñ ne majnūñ pe laḌakpan meñ 'asad'

sañg uThāyā thā ki sar yaad aayā

Even as I, a young lad, picked up a stone to cast at Majnun

The vision of my own bleeding head as I would grow up passed before my eyes [and the stone dropped from my hand

-Ghalib

== Urdu Ghazal Poets ==
=== Classical ===
- Wali Mohammed Wali
- Khwaja Mir Dard
- Mirza Muhammad Rafi
- Mir Taqi Mir
- Momin Khan Momin
- Mohammad Ibrahim Zauq
- Mirza Asadullah Khan Ghalib
- Daagh Dehlvi

=== Modernist ===
- Altaf Hussain Hali
- Muhammad Iqbal
- Maulana Inam Thanvi
- Josh Malsiyani
- Firaq Gorakhpuri
- Faiz Ahmed Faiz

=== Contemporary ===
- Kishwar Naheed
- Fehmida Riaz
- Parveen Shakir
- Javed Akhtar
- Ada Jafri
- Irfan Siddiqui
- Rahat Indori
- Jaun Elia

== See also ==
- Urdu literature
- Urdu poetry
