= Gulbahar (disambiguation) =

Gulbahar is a neighborhood of Karachi, Sindh, Pakistan.

Gulbahar may also refer to:

- Gulbahar, Afghanistan, town in Parwan province
- Gulbahar, Peshawar, neighbourhood of Peshawar in Khyber Pakhtunkhwa province
- Gulbahar (TV series), 2026 Pakistani series

== Given name ==
- Gulbahar Bano, Pakistani ghazal singer
- Gulbahar Begum (d. 1863), Sikh empire queen consort

== Surname ==
- Adil Gulbahar (born 1985), Pakistani cricketer

== See also ==
- Gülbahar, Turkish feminine given name
