= Urdu poetry =

Tradition of poetry

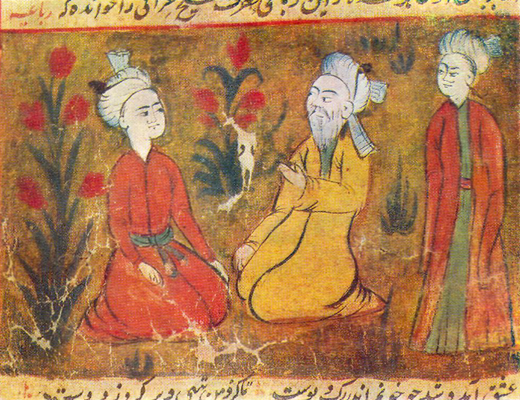
Amir Khusrau, a 13th-century Urdu poet.

Urdu poetry (Urdu: اُردُو شاعرى urdū śāʿirī) is a tradition of poetry and has many different forms. Today, it is an important part of the culture of India and Pakistan. According to Naseer Turabi, there are five major poets of Urdu: Mir Taqi Mir (d. 1810), Mirza Ghalib (d. 1869), Mir Anees (d. 1874), Muhammad Iqbal (d. 1938) and Josh Malihabadi (d. 1982). The language of Urdu reached its pinnacle under the British Raj, and it received official status. All famous writers of Urdu language including Ghalib and Iqbal were given British scholarships. Following the Partition of India in 1947, it found major poets and scholars were divided along nationalistic lines. However, Urdu poetry is cherished in both countries. Muslims, as well as Hindus and Sikhs alike from across the border, continue the tradition.

It is fundamentally performative poetry, and its recital, sometimes impromptu, is held in Mushairas (poetic expositions). Although its tarannum saaz (singing aspect) has undergone major changes in recent decades, its popularity among the masses remains unaltered. Mushairas are today held in metropolitan areas worldwide because of the cultural influence of the South Asian diaspora. Ghazal singing and Qawwali are also important expository forms of Urdu poetry.

== Forms ==
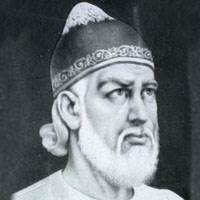
Ghulam Hamdani Mas'hafi, the poet first believed to have coined the name "Urdu" around 1780 AD for a language that went by a multiplicity of names before his time.

The principal forms of Urdu poetry are:

- Ghazal (غزل): a set of two-liner couplets, which strictly should end with the same rhyme and should be within one of the predefined meters of ghazals. There has to be a minimum of five couplets to form a ghazal. Couplets may or may not have the same thought. It is one of the most difficult forms of poetry as there are many strict parameters that one needs to abide by while writing a ghazal. It is important to think about the topic as well as the theme of a ghazal before starting to write it. The first line of a ghazal must include a refrain, which is a word or a phrase that can be easily fitted into the other couplets. Each couplet of a ghazal is known as Sher (شعر). The first Sher is called Matla' (مطلع). The last Sher is called Maqta' (مقطع ), but only if the poet uses his "Takhallus (تخلص)".
- Hamd (حمّد): a poem in praise of God. The word "hamd" is derived from the Qur'an; its English translation is "Praise".
- Manqabat (منقبت): a Sufi devotional poem, in praise of Ali ibn Abi Talib, the son-in-law of Muhammad, or of any Sufi saint.
- Marsiya (مرثیہ): an elegy typically composed about the death of Hasan, Husayn, their relatives, and their companions. Each stanza has six lines, with the rhyme scheme AAAABB. The famous marsiya writers who inherited the tradition of Mir Anees among his successive generations are Mir Nawab Ali 'Munis', Dulaha Sahab 'Uruj', Syed Mohammed Mohsin (Jaunpuri), Mustafa Meerza urf Piyare Sahab 'Rasheed', Syed Muhammad Mirza Uns, Ali Nawab 'Qadeem', Syed Sajjad Hussain "Shadeed" Lucknavi, Allama, Dr. Syed Ali Imam Zaidi, "Gauher" Luckhnavi, the great-grandson of Mir Babber Ali Anees, Syed Karrar Hyder (Jaunpuri) and his son Syed Yadullah Haider.
- Masnavi (مثنوی): a poem written in couplets in bacchic tetrameter with an iambus for last foot. The topic is often romance. Mir Taqi Mir and Sauda wrote some of this kind. The Religious Masnavi History of Islam (Tarikh-e-Islam Az Quran) was written by Dr Syed Ali Imam Zaidi Gauher Lucknavi.
- Na`at (نعت): poetry that specifically praises the Islamic prophet Muhammad.
- Nazm (نظم): the basic type of Urdu poetry. It can be written on any topic, and so a wide host of Nazm exists. From Nazeer Akbarabadi, Iqbal, Josh, Firaq, Akhtarul Iman to down the line Noon Meem Rashid, Faiz, Ali Sardar Jafri and Kaifi Azmi, Urdu poets have covered common life, philosophical thinking, national issues and the precarious predicament of an individual human being. As a distinct form of Nazm, many Urdu poets influenced by English and other European poets took to writing sonnets in the Urdu language. Azmatullah Khan (1887–1923) is believed to have introduced this format to Urdu Literature. The other renowned Urdu poets who wrote sonnets were Akhtar Junagarhi, Akhtar Sheerani, Noon Meem Rashid, Zia Fatehabadi, Salaam Machhalishahari and Wazir Agha.
- Qasida (قصیدہ): usually an ode to a benefactor, a satire, or an account of an event. It uses the same rhyme system as the ghazal, but is usually longer.
- Ruba'i (رُباعی): a poetry style, the Arabic term for "quatrain". The plural form of the word, rubāʿiyāt, often anglicised rubaiyat, is used to describe a collection of such quatrains.
- Tazkira (تذکرہ): a biographical anthology of poetry.

=== Collection forms ===
The principal collection forms of Urdu poetry are:

- Diwan: a collection of ghazals.
- Kulliyat: a complete collection of poems by one author.

== Formation ==
Urdu poetry forms itself with following basic ingredients:

- Bait (بیت)
- Bait-ul-Ghazal (بیت الغزل)
- Beher (بحر)
- Diwan (دیوان)
- Husn-E-Matla (حسنِ مطلع)
- Kalam (کلام)
- Kulyat (کلیات)
- Maqta (مقطع)
- Matla (مطلع)
- Mavra (ماوراء)
- Misra (مصرع)
- Mushaira (مشاعرہ)
- Qaafiyaa (قافیہ)
- Radif (ردیف)
- Sher (شعر)
- Shayar (شاعر)
- Tah-Tul-Lafz (تحت اللفظ)
- Takhallus (تخلص)
- Tarannum (ترنم)
- Triveni (تریوینی)

== Genres ==
The major genres of poetry found in Urdu are:

- Doha (دوہا)
- Fard (فرد)
- Geet (گیت)
- Ghazal (غزل), as practiced by many poets in the Arab tradition. Mir, Ghalib, Dagh are well-known composers of ghazal.
- Hamd (حمد)
- Hazal (ہزل)
- Hijv (ہجو)
- Kafi (کافی)
- Madah (مدح)
- Manqabat (منقبت)
- Marsiya (مرثیہ)
- Masnavi (مثنوی)
- Munajat (مناجات)
- Musaddas (مسدس)
- Mukhammas (مخمس)
- Na`at (نعت)
- Nazm (نظم)
- Noha (نوحہ)
- Qasida (قصیدہ)
- Qat'ã (قطعہ)
- Qawwali (قوالی)
- Rubai (رباعی) (a.k.a. Rubayyat or Rubaiyat) (رباعیات)
- Salam (سلام)
- Sehra (سہرا)
- Shehr a'ashob (شہر آشوب)
- Soz (سوز)
- Wasokht (وسوخت)

== Pen names ==
In the Urdu poetic tradition, most poets use a pen name called the Takhallus (تخلص). This can be either a part of a poet's given name or something else adopted as an identity. The traditional convention in identifying Urdu poets is to mention the takhallus at the end of the name. The word takhallus is derived from Arabic, meaning "ending". This is because in the Ghazal form, the poet would usually incorporate their pen name into the final couplet (Arabic: مقطع, romanized: maqta') of each poem.

== Scripts used in poetry ==
In Pakistan and the Deccan region of India, Urdu poetry is written in the standard Nasta'liq calligraphy style of the Perso-Arabic script. However, in northern India, where Urdu poetry is very popular, the Perso-Arabic script is often found transliterated into the Devanagari script, as an aid for those Hindī-speakers who can comprehend Urdu but cannot read the Perso-Arabic script. With the dawn of the internet and globalisation, this poetry is often found written in Roman Urdu as well as in Hindi script.

=== Example of Urdu ghazal ===
The following is a verse from an Urdu ghazal by Syed Khwaja Mir Dard:

Urdu:

دوستو، دیکھا تماشا یہاں کا بس
تم رہو؛ اب ہم تو اپنے گھر چلے

درج ذیل غزل اردو کے نوجوان شاعر نقی نقوی کی ہے

Urdu Ghazal:

خشک آنکھوں میں ذرا پانی کا قطرہ چھوڑ دو

مجھ کو تھوڑی دیر کی خاطر اکیلا چھوڑ دو

مت بنانا قتل کا منصوبہ دشمن کے لئے

مارنا ہی ہے اگر اس کو تو زندہ چھوڑ دو

وہ ترستا ہے تمھارے ہونٹ چھونے کے لئے

تم بھی پانی مت پیو دریا کو پیاسا چھوڑ دو

میں ابھی مصروف ہوں اپنی ہی صلح و جنگ میں

خود کو سلجھاتے ہوئے خود میں الجھتا چھوڑ دو

جانب ِ منزل قدم اپنے بڑھاؤ تیز تیز

یا پھر آگے چلنے والوں میرا رستہ چھوڑ دو

صرف اپنے کام سے ہی کام رکھّو اے نقیؔ

جو بھی جیسا چل رہا ہے اس کو ویسا چھوڑ دو

Roman Urdu:

Dōstō, dēkhā tamāśhā yahān kā bas
Tum rahō; ab ham tō apnē ghar chalē.

English translation:

Friends, I've seen the spectacle of this place enough
You stay here; I'm heading home.

Note Dard's use of the royal we in this couplet, a technique characteristic of formal Urdu poetry.

== See also ==
- Urdu ghazal
- Bait Bazi, a game using Urdu poetry
- Chaar bayt a folk art of singing
- List of Urdu poets
- Persian and Urdu
- Persian language in the Indian subcontinent
- Progressive Writers' Movement
- Rekhta
- Shahr Ashob
