= Matla' =

In Arabic, Persian, Turkic, and Urdu poetry, the matla' (from Arabic مطلع maṭlaʿ, lit. 'rising place'; Persian: مطلع; Azerbaijani: mətlə; Turkish: matla; Uzbek: matla; Urdu: مطلع) is the first bayt, or couplet, of a classical poem such as a qasida or a ghazal. In this sense, it is the opposite of the maqta'.

It is possible, although extremely rare, for there to be more than one matla' in a poem; in this case, the second is referred to as husn-e-matla. It is an important part of the composition because it establishes the overall meter, form, and mood of the entire piece.

The defining feature of the matla' is that both verses (hemistichs) of the couplet rhyme. Expressed in technical terminology, both verses end with the same qafiya (rhyme) and radif (refrain) of the poem. In fact, the purpose of the matla' is to definitively set the qafiya and radif that will be followed for the rest of the composition.
