= Ghazal =

Poem or ode that deals with love

Ghazal by Sa'di of Shiraz (13th century)

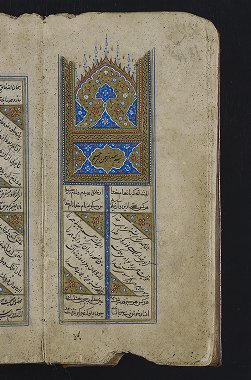
An illustrated headpiece from a mid-18th century collection of ghazals and rubāʻīyāt

Ghazal (Note: (Arabic: غَزَل, Bengali: গজল, Hindi-Urdu: ग़ज़ल/غَزَل, Persian: غزل, Azerbaijani: qəzəl, Turkish: gazel, Turkmen: gazal, Uzbek: gʻazal, Gujarati: ગઝલ, Punjabi: ਗ਼ਜ਼ਲ)) is a form of amatory poem or ode, originating in Arabic poetry and a predominant form in Persian Poetry, that often deals with topics of spiritual and romantic love. It may be understood as a poetic expression of both the pain of loss, or separation from the beloved, and the beauty of love in spite of that pain.

The ghazal form is ancient, tracing its origins to 7th-century Arabic poetry. It flourished in Persian poetry in the works of Sa'di (1209–1291) and Hafez (1325–1390). It spread into the Indian subcontinent in the 12th century due to the influence of Islam in the courts of the new Islamic Sultanate, and is now most prominently a form of poetry of many languages of South Asia and Turkey. It set to music has also become a popular music genre in Malaysia and Singapore courtesy of Indian trade.

The rhyming pattern of Ghazal (the rhyme appears at the end of every verse and additionally at the end of the first half-verse)

The unit of ghazal is a line (beyt) and each line is made of two parts with identical meter. A ghazal commonly consists of five to fifteen lines, which are relatively independent, but linked – abstractly, in their theme; and more strictly in their meter, and rhyming pattern.

The structural requirements of ghazal are similar in stringency to those of the Petrarchan sonnet. In style and content, due to its highly allusive nature, ghazal has proved capable of an extraordinary variety of expression around its central themes of love and separation.

== Etymology and pronunciation ==
The word ghazal originates from the Arabic word غزل (ġazal). This genre of Arabic poetry is derived from غَزَل (ḡazal) or غَزِلَ (ḡazila) - To sweet-talk, to flirt, to display amorous gestures.

The Arabic word غزل ġazal is pronounced [ˈɣazal]. In English, the word is pronounced /ˈɡʌzəl/ or /ˈɡæzæl/.

== Poetic form ==
The ghazal is a short poem consisting of rhyming couplets, called bayt or sher. Most ghazals have between seven and twelve bayts. For a poem to be considered a true ghazal, it must have no fewer than five couplets. Almost all ghazals confine themselves to less than fifteen couplets (poems that exceed this length are more accurately considered as qasidas). Ghazal couplets end with the same rhyming pattern and are expected to have the same meter. The ghazal's uniqueness arises from its rhyme and refrain rules, referred to as the qafiya and radif respectively. A ghazal's rhyming pattern may be described as AA BA CA DA, and so on.

In its strictest structural form, a classical ghazal follows a number of rules:

1. Matla': The first sher in a ghazal is called the matla'. Both lines of the matla' must contain the qafiya and radif. The matla' sets the tone of the ghazal, as well as its rhyming and refrain pattern.
2. Radif: The refrain word or phrase. Both lines of the matla' and the second lines of all subsequent shers must end in the same refrain word called the radif.
3. Qafiya: The rhyming pattern. The radif is immediately preceded by words or phrases with the same end rhyme pattern, called the qafiya.
4. Maqta': The last couplet of the ghazal is called the maqta'. It is common in ghazals for the poet's nom de plume, known as takhallus to be featured in the maqta'. The maqta' is typically more personal than the other couplets in a ghazal.
5. Bahr: Each line of a ghazal must follow the same metrical pattern and syllabic (or morae) count.

Unlike in a nazm, a ghazal's couplets do not need a common theme or continuity. Each verse is self-contained and independent from the others, containing the complete expression of an idea. However, the verses all contain a thematic or tonal connection to each other, which may be highly allusive. A common conceit that traces its history to the origins of the ghazal form is that the poem is addressed to a beloved by the narrator. Abdolhamid Ziaei considers the content of old Persian ghazal to include four elements: love, mysticism, education or excellence, and Qalandari.

== Interpreting a ghazal ==
The Ghazal tradition is marked by the poetry's ambiguity and simultaneity of meaning. Learning the common tropes is key to understanding the ghazal.

There are several locations an Urdu sher might take place in:

- The Garden, where the poet often takes on the personage of the bulbul, a songbird. The poet is singing to the beloved, who is often embodied as a rose.

hoon garmi-i-nishat-i-tasavvur se naghma sanj

Main andalib-i-gulshan-i-na afridah hoon

- Ghalib

I sing from the warmth of the passionate joy of thought

I am the bulbul of a garden not yet created

- The Tavern, or the maikhana, where the poet drinks wine in search of enlightenment, union with God, and desolation of self.

mir un neem-baaz ankhon men saari masti sharab ki si hai

- Mir Taqi Mir

'Mir' is in those half-closed eyes all flirtation is a bit like wine

== History ==
=== Origins in Arabia ===
The ghazal originated in Arabia in the 7th century, evolving from the qasida, a pre-Islamic Arabic poetic form. While the qaṣīda was a long-form poem (often up to 100 couplets) focusing on tribal panegyrics, lampoons, or moral maxims, its opening prelude, known as the nasīb, was thematic for nostalgia and romance. Over time, the nasīb began to be written as standalone, shorter poems, which became the ghazal.

The ghazal blossomed as an independent genre during the Umayyad era (661–750) and continued to develop in the early Abbasid era. It inherited the formal structure of the qaṣīda, specifically the strict adherence to meter and the use of the qafiya (end rhyme). To meet the demands of musical presentation, the ghazal became briefer and utilized lighter poetic meters, such as Khafīf, Ramal, and Mutaqārib, moving away from the more ponderous meters like Kāmil, Basīṭ, and Rajaz.

Thematically, the Arabic ghazal branched into two primary schools:

- The Udhri school (al-ghazal al-ʿudhrī): Named after the Banu Udhra tribe, it emphasized "courtly" or Platonic love, characterized by devotion and suffering (e.g., Jamil ibn Ma'mar).
- The Hijazi school (al-ghazal al-ṣarīḥ): Known for its erotic or explicit themes and a more lighthearted tone (e.g., Umar ibn Abi Rabi'ah).

==== Spread of the Arabian ghazal ====
With the spread of Islam, the Arabian ghazal spread westwards into Africa and Al-Andalus, and eastwards into Persia. Its popularity was closely tied to the spread of the Arabic language. In medieval Spain, ghazals were written in both Arabic and Hebrew (by Jewish poets influenced by Arabic prosody) as early as the 11th century. The form also influenced West African literary languages such as Hausa and Fulfulde.

=== Dispersion into Persia ===
==== Early adoption (10th to 11th century) ====
The ghazal was introduced into Persian literature during the 10th century, adopting the structural and thematic framework of the Arabic ghazal. Early Persian ghazals maintained the standard features of the Arabic qasida, specifically the matla' (opening couplet). This opening followed the Arabic tradition of tasrīʿ (rhyming both hemistichs of the first verse), a rule established in Arabic prosody centuries prior to its adoption in Persia.

During the Samanid era, poets such as Rudaki (d. 941 CE) adapted Arabic quantitative meters (arūḍ) to the Persian language. While Rudaki is often called the founder of classical Persian poetry, his work was fundamentally an application of Arabic metrical and rhyming systems to Persian linguistic structures.

==== Structural Formalization (12th to 13th century) ====
Between the 12th and 13th centuries, the Persian ghazal underwent a process of formalization. A notable convention of this period was the consistent use of the Takhallus (pen name). While Arabic poets were traditionally identified by their laqab (titles) or kunya, Persianate poets formalized the inclusion of the takhallus within the maqta' (concluding couplet). By the time of Saadi Shirazi (d. 1291), this had become a mandatory structural element.

During this evolution, the Persian ghazal retained the Arabic principle of wahdat al-bayt (independence of the couplet). In this classical structure, inherited directly from Arabic verse, each couplet functions as an autonomous semantic unit, often independent of the preceding or following verses, while maintaining a unified meter and rhyme throughout the poem.

==== Expansion into South Asia ====
The expansion of the ghazal into South Asia was facilitated by the establishment of Persian as the primary administrative and literary language of the Mughal Empire. By the 18th and 19th centuries, the ghazal transitioned from Persian into Urdu (Hindustani), reaching its classical "Golden Age" through the works of poets such as Mir Taqi Mir and Mirza Ghalib. During this period, the Urdu ghazal became the preeminent lyric genre in Northern India, maintaining the classical Persianate structural requirements while adapting to local linguistic nuances.

=== Introduction into the Indian subcontinent ===
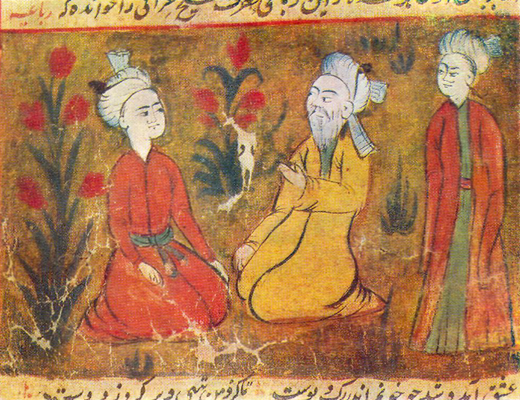
Amir Khusrow teaching his disciples. Khusrow is a seminal figure in the Persianate literary tradition of South Asia.

The ghazal was introduced to the Indian subcontinent in the 12th century, following the establishment of the Ghurid dynasty and the subsequent Delhi Sultanate. While initially a courtly form of Persian poetry, it was significantly disseminated through the influence of Sufi mystics, who utilized the ghazal's lyrical and metaphorical framework to express divine love.

In the 13th century, Hasan Sijzi became a pivotal figure in the development of the Indo-Persian ghazal, earning the title of the "Saadi of Hind" for his mastery of the form. His contemporary, Amir Khusrow, is recognized for pioneering the literary use of the vernacular Hindustani language (then known as Hindavi), blending Persian poetic structures with local linguistic elements. Khusrow's work marked the beginning of a linguistic synthesis that would eventually lead to the development of the modern Urdu ghazal.

During the late 14th century, the Sultanate of Bengal emerged as a significant center for Persian literature under Sultan Ghiyasuddin Azam Shah. The literary prestige of the Bengali court is highlighted by the Sultan's correspondence with the Persian poet Hafez, who reportedly composed a poem in response to the Sultan's invitation.

In the 20th century, the ghazal form was adapted into the Bengali language. Atul Prasad Sen is credited with pioneering this transition during his residence in Lucknow. The Bengali ghazal was further developed and popularized by Kazi Nazrul Islam, who integrated the classical Persianate structure with Bengali musical and linguistic traditions.

=== Transmission to Southeast Asia ===
The ghazal spread to the Malay Peninsula in two forms both performed in the Malay language. The most popular found particularly in Johore and the island of Singapore introduced by Punjabi Muslims and Sikhs to the Malay upper class of the Johor-Riau-Lingga sultanate focused in Penyengat Island part of the Riau. This spread with Temenggong Abdul Rahman moving his seat of power to Telok Blangah, Singapore following the Anglo-Dutch Treaty of 1824 as well as the incorporation of those North Indian communities into the colonial workforce during British rule there; the Western violin takes in place the role of the sarangi here while the harmonium is sometimes substituted with the accordion. The Johor royal surveyor Muhammad Salleh Perang was a great proponent of this art.

Another more obscure form is the ghazal parti performed in Penang by its Jawi Peranakan community, said to originate from Syeikh Abdullah Fahim's son Ahmad Badawi in Kepala Batas on the Seberang Perai region in the 1950s. Ghazal parti as its name suggests is more festive and casual with incorporation of dancing and interval comedy acts; altogether usually performed in functions attended by religious teachers and imams.

== Themes ==
=== Love and Longing ===
The primary theme of the ghazal is unrequited love (ishq), traditionally portrayed from the perspective of a lover dealing with the agony of separation from an unattainable beloved. This thematic focus originated in the nasīb of the pre-Islamic and Umayyad-era Arabic qasida. The Arabic poetic tradition established two influential schools: the Udhri school (Platonic, sacrificial love) and the Hissi school (sensual, erotic love). These foundations provided the lyrical framework later adopted by Persian and Urdu poets.

The beloved in a ghazal is often depicted as indifferent or even "cruel," utilizing metaphors of "arrows" (eyelashes) or "captivation." While later Persianate traditions often neutralized the gender of the beloved, the structural impetus remains the tension between the lover's devotion and the social or physical barriers to union.

=== Spiritual and Sufi Interpretation ===
Historically, the ghazal's imagery was adapted by Sufi poets (such as Rumi and Hafiz) to represent Divine Love (Ishq-e-haqiqi). In this context, the "Beloved" serves as a metaphor for the Creator or a spiritual master, and the "wine" symbolizes spiritual ecstasy.

Modern scholarship distinguishes between three layers of interpretation in ghazal couplets:

- Ishq-e-Majazi: Earthly, human love.
- Ishq-e-Haqiqi: Divine, spiritual love.
- Ambiguous: Couplets designed to be interpreted in either a secular or sacred context, a hallmark of the classical Persian and Urdu style.

=== Social and Metaphysical Questions ===
While love remains the core, the ghazal has historically evolved to include philosophical inquiries, metaphysical questions, and social commentary. In the works of later masters like Mirza Ghalib, the form was utilized to express complex existential doubts and reflections on human destiny, moving beyond purely romantic or mystical boundaries.

== Important ghazal poets ==
=== Arabic ===
The ghazal originated and was first codified by Arabic poets. Key figures include:

- Imru' al-Qais (6th century): Whose Mu'allaqa established the nasīb (romantic prelude) as the structural precursor to the ghazal.
- Jamil ibn Ma'mar (d. 701): The leading figure of the Udhri school (Platonic, chaste love).
- Umar ibn Abi Rabi'ah (d. 712): The pioneer of the Hijazi school of urban, erotic ghazal.
- Abbas Ibn al-Ahnaf (d. 808): The Abbasid poet who specialized exclusively in the ghazal, refining its lyrical language.
- Ibn Zaydun (d. 1071): A master of the Andalusian ghazal, famous for his poems to Wallada bint al-Mustakfi.

=== Persian ===
- Rudaki (c. 858 – 940/41) a court poet under the Samanids and a musician. He is regarded as one of the first major poets to write in New Persian.
- Attar of Neyshābur (c.1045 – c. 1221) was a famous mystic and hagiographer. Ghazals make a large part of his Divan.
- Rumi (1207 – 1273). His most famous ghazals are those dedicated to another mystic, Shams of Tabriz. The collection is known as the Ghazaliāt of Shams.
- Hafiz of Shiraz (1315 – 1390) is most exclusively celebrated for his ghazals collected in his Divān.
- Sa'di of Shiraz (1210 – 1291) is famous as one of the masters of ghazal form.

=== Turkic and Ottoman ===
- Yunus Emre, Fuzuli, and Nasimi.

=== Urdu and North Indian ===
- Mir Taqi Mir, Sauda, Mirza Ghalib, Bahadur Shah Zafar, Daagh Dehlvi, and Muhammad Iqbal.
- Kazi Nazrul Islam (Bengal).
- Naqi Naqvi (اردو کے نوجوان شاعر)

=== Other Languages ===
- German: Influenced by Goethe, the form was popularized by Friedrich Rückert and August von Platen.
- English: Agha Shahid Ali, who championed the "real Ghazal" in English.
- Nepali: Moti Ram Bhatta (1866–1896), the pioneer of the Nepali ghazal.
- Pashto: Hamza Shinwari, regarded as the "Father of Pashto Ghazals."
- Marathi: Suresh Bhat is considered the pioneer of Ghazal in Marathi.

=== Arabic Musical Roots ===
The ghazal has been intrinsically linked to musical performance since its inception in the 7th-century Hejaz. During the Umayyad and early Abbasid eras, the cities of Medina and Mecca served as the primary centers for musical innovation, where the ghazal was performed mostly by professional singers (Qiyan).

This tradition was directly transplanted to Al-Andalus by Al-Hakam I (r. 796–822), who established specialized schools in Cordoba known for housing the Madaniyat—female singers brought specifically from Medina. These schools functioned as the first formal conservatories in Europe, predating the arrival of Ziryab and ensuring that the Arabic lyrical and metrical foundations of the ghazal were firmly established in the Iberian Peninsula.

=== Regional Traditions ===
Over centuries, the musical rendering of the ghazal diversified across different Islamic cultures:

- Central Asia and Persia: Performed within classical systems such as the Shashmakom (Uzbek-Tajik), the Persian Dastgah, and the Uyghur Muqam.
- South Asia: Developed into a sophisticated vocal style known as Ghazal Gayaki. While it has roots in Indo-Persian court music, it gained widespread popularity in the 20th century through performers like Begum Akhtar and Mehdi Hassan.

=== Translations ===
The global reach of the ghazal is reflected in numerous academic and literary translations. Notable scholars who have translated classical Persian and Arabic ghazals into European languages include Annemarie Schimmel, Arthur John Arberry, and Friedrich Rückert. These translations often grapple with the challenge of preserving the strict mono-rhyme (qafiya) and meter (bahr) of the original texts.

== Global Popularity and Modern Evolution ==
The ghazal remains a popular poetic form across the Middle East, North Africa, and South Asia. Historically a courtly art patronized by royalty—including the Mughal emperors and Persian monarchs—it has successfully transitioned into a popular contemporary genre through musical adaptation.

=== Middle East and North Africa ===
In the Arab world, the ghazal tradition continues to be a cornerstone of modern music. During the 20th century, the "Golden Age" of Arabic song, led by figures such as Umm Kulthum, Mohammed Abdel Wahab, and Abdel Halim Hafez, relied heavily on the ghazal and qasida forms. These performances bridged the gap between classical linguistic structures and mass popularity, often utilizing the Maqam system to convey the poem's emotional nuances. Similarly, in Turkey, the ghazal (gazel) is a fundamental component of classical Ottoman music and remains influential in modern traditional performances.

=== South Asia ===
The ghazal achieved immense popularity in South Asia through its transition into the Urdu language. While traditionally associated with the elite mehfil (literary gatherings), the genre reached a broader audience through South Asian film music (Bollywood and Lollywood).

In the 20th century, performers such as Begum Akhtar, Mehdi Hassan, and Jagjit Singh modernized the ghazal by incorporating varied musical elements, including Western instruments like the guitar, while maintaining classical frameworks such as raga and tala. The form has also been adapted into numerous regional languages, including Bengali (pioneered by Kazi Nazrul Islam), Gujarati, Marathi, and Telugu.

=== The West and Beyond ===
The ghazal’s influence extended to Western literature in the 19th century, notably through Goethe's West–Eastern Diwan, which was inspired by the works of Hafez. This sparked a tradition of ghazal writing in German literature, practiced by poets like Friedrich Rückert. In the 20th century, Spanish poet Federico García Lorca experimented with the form in his Diván del Tamarit, while contemporary English-language poets, such as Agha Shahid Ali, have worked to introduce the strict classical constraints of the ghazal into English prosody.

=== Modern Adaptations ===
In recent decades, the ghazal has undergone stylistic simplification to reach global audiences. Modern poets (shayars) sometimes employ simpler vocabulary and less rigid adherence to classical rules, reflecting contemporary social themes and a shift toward more diverse perspectives, including female-centric narratives (e.g., Parveen Shakir).

== In English ==
After nearly a century of "false starts," the early experiments of James Clarence Mangan, James Elroy Flecker, Adrienne Rich, Phyllis Webb, etc., many of whom did not adhere wholly or in part to the traditional principles of the form, experiments dubbed as "the bastard Ghazal," the ghazal finally began to be recognized as a viable closed form in poetry of the English language some time in the early to mid-1990s. It came about largely as a result of serious, true-to-form examples being published by noted American poets John Hollander, W. S. Merwin and Elise Paschen as well as by Kashmiri-American poet Agha Shahid Ali, who had been teaching and spreading word of the Ghazal at American universities over the previous two decades. Jim Harrison created his own free-form Ghazal true to his poetic vision in Outlyer and Ghazals (1971).

In 1996, Ali compiled and edited the world's first anthology of English-language ghazals, published by Wesleyan University Press in 2000, as Ravishing DisUnities: Real Ghazals in English. (Fewer than one in ten of the ghazals collected in Real Ghazals in English observe the constraints of the form.)

A ghazal is composed of couplets, five or more. The couplets may have nothing to do with one another except for the formal unity derived from a strict rhyme and rhythm pattern.

A ghazal in English observes the traditional restrictions of the form:

Where are you now? Who lies beneath your spell tonight?
Whom else from rapture's road will you expel tonight?

Those "Fabrics of Cashmere—" "to make Me beautiful—"
"Trinket"— to gem– "Me to adorn– How– tell"— tonight?

I beg for haven: Prisons, let open your gates–
A refugee from Belief seeks a cell tonight.

God's vintage loneliness has turned to vinegar–
All the archangels– their wings frozen– fell tonight.

Lord, cried out the idols, Don't let us be broken
Only we can convert the infidel tonight.

Mughal ceilings, let your mirrored convexities
multiply me at once under your spell tonight.

He's freed some fire from ice in pity for Heaven.
He's left open– for God– the doors of Hell tonight.

In the heart's veined temple, all statues have been smashed
No priest in saffron's left to toll its knell tonight.

God, limit these punishments, there's still Judgment Day–
I'm a mere sinner, I'm no infidel tonight.

Executioners near the woman at the window.
Damn you, Elijah, I'll bless Jezebel tonight.

The hunt is over, and I hear the Call to Prayer
fade into that of the wounded gazelle tonight.

My rivals for your love– you've invited them all?
This is mere insult, this is no farewell tonight.

And I, Shahid, only am escaped to tell thee–
God sobs in my arms. Call me Ishmael tonight.

— Agha Shahid Ali

=== Notable poets who composed ghazals in English ===
- Agha Shahid Ali, "Ghazal ('...exiles')"
- Robert Bly, The Night Abraham Called to the Stars and My Sentence Was a Thousand Years of Joy
- Francis Brabazon, In Dust I Sing (Beguine Library, 1974).
- Fern G. Z. Carr, "Ghazal for M."
- G.S. Sharat Chandra, "The Anonymous Lover"
- Andrew D. Chumbley, "Qutub" (Xoanon), 1995.
- Maryann Corbett, "Storybook Ghazal"
- Lorna Crozier, "Bones in Their Wings"
- Sukhdarshan Dhaliwal, "Ghazals at Twilight" (SD Publications), 2009
- Judith Fitzgerald, Twenty-Six Ways Out of This World (Oberon), 1999.
- Marilyn Hacker, A Stranger's Mirror: New and Selected Poems 1994 - 2014 (2015) ISBN 978-0-393-24464-9
- Jim Harrison, Outlyer and Ghazals (Touchstone), 1971
- John Hollander, "Ghazal On Ghazals"
- Galway Kinnell, "Sheffield Ghazal 4: Driving West", "Sheffield Ghazal 5: Passing the Cemetery" (Mariner Books), 2001
- Marilyn Krysl, "Ghazals for the Turn of the Century"
- Maxine Kumin, "On the Table"
- Edward Lowbury, "A Ghazel (for Pauline)" (1968); "Prometheus: a ghazel" (1976); "Remembering Nine (a ghazel for Peter Russell)" (1981)
- William Matthews, "Guzzle", "Drizzle"
- W. S. Merwin, "The Causeway"
- Elise Paschen, "Sam's Ghazal"
- Robert Pinsky, "The Hall"
- Spencer Reece, Florida Ghazals
- Adrienne Rich, Ghazals: Homage to Ghalib
- John Thompson, "Stilt Jack" (Anansi), 1978.
- Natasha Trethewey, "Miscegenation", 2006.
- Phyllis Webb, Water and Light: Ghazals and Anti Ghazals (Coach House), 1984.
- John Edgar Wideman, "Lost Letter"
- Eleanor Wilner, "Ghazal on What's to Lose, or Not"
- Rob Winger, "The Chimney Stone" (Nightwood Editions), 2010

== Ghazal in Music ==
Ghazals have been used in music throughout South Asia and has become a genre of its own, simply called "Ghazal" which refers to the music genre. The Ghazal music genre is most popular in Afghanistan, Pakistan and India.

Some notable Afghan ghazal singers are (Persian/Pashtu):

- Sarahang
- Ulfat

Some notable Pakistani and Indian ghazal singers are (Urdu/Hindi):

- Ahmed Rushdi
- Abida Parveen
- Ali Sethi
- Amjad Parvez
- Anuradha Paudwal
- Anup Jalota
- Ataullah Khan
- Ateeq Hussain Khan
- Salma Agha
- Kiran Ahluwalia
- Begum Akhtar
- Ghulam Ali
- Talat Aziz
- Gulbahar Bano
- Iqbal Bano
- Beauty Sharma Barua
- Munni Begum
- Asha Bhosle
- Rahmatullah Dard
- Chandan Dass
- Pankaj Udhas
- Hariharan
- Mehdi Hassan
- Ahmed and Mohammed Hussain
- Cassius Khan
- Nusrat Fateh Ali Khan
- Ustad Amanat Ali Khan
- Asad Amanat Ali Khan
- Shafqat Amanat Ali Khan
- Shreya Ghoshal
- Bade Fateh Ali Khan
- Hamid Ali Khan
- Shahabaz Aman
- Khalil Haider
- Farida Khanum
- Runa Laila
- Master Madan
- Talat Mahmood
- Mahwash
- Lata Mangeshkar
- Penaz Masani
- Aziz Mian
- Habib Wali Mohammad
- Mukesh
- Sonu Nigam
- Nayyara Noor
- Noorjehan
- Bhimrao Panchale
- Shishir Parkhie
- Malika Pukhraj
- Mohammed Rafi
- Roop Kumar Rathod
- Sunali Rathod
- Reshma
- Rahat Fateh Ali Khan
- Sabri Brothers
- Jagjit Singh
- Sajjad Ali
- Mohammad Hussain Sarahang
- Mohammad Reza Shajarian
- Bhupinder and Mitali Singh
- Jasvinder Singh
- Ghazal Srinivas
- Adithya Srinivasan
- Tahira Syed
- Manhar Udhas
- Nirmal Udhas
- Pankaj Udhas
- Suresh Wadkar
- Ahmad Wali
- Alka Yagnik
- Umbayee

Many Indian and Pakistani film singers are famous for singing ghazals, such as these:

- Ahmed Rushdi
- Hariharan
- Mehdi Hassan
- Jagjit Singh
- Noor Jehan
- Talat Mahmood
- Lata Mangeshkar
- Srilekha Parthasarathy
- Mohammad Rafi
- Shiv Dayal Batish
- Shreya Ghoshal
- Ghulam Ali
- K. L. Saigal
- Saleem Raza
- Chitra Singh
- Asha Bhosle
- Tina Sani

Some Malay singers are famous for singing Ghazal, such as these:

- Jamal Abdillah
- Sharifah Aini
- Rosiah Chik
- Noraniza Idris
- Rhoma Irama
- M. Nasir

== See also ==
- Filmi-ghazal, Indian filmi music based on ghazal poetry
- Qawwali, a music genre from South Asia
