= Khan Ghazi Kabuli =

Afghan poet and writer (died 1988)

- Undated and unconfirmed photo of Kabuli
- Born: Habibur Rahman c. 1885 or c. 1900; Dragi village, Khost, Afghanistan
- Died: 2 February 1988; India
- Occupations: Poet; journalist; writer; activist
- Writing career
- Language: Urdu
- Genre: Nazm
- Notable work: Tahreek-e-Khudai Khidmatgar

Habibur Rahman (Note: Urdu: حبیب الرحمن) (c. 1885 or c. 1900 – 2 February 1988) commonly known by the pen name Khan Ghazi Kabuli, (Note: Urdu: خان غازی کابلی) was an Afghan Urdu poet, journalist and writer based in Delhi, British India. He was one of the activists of the Indian independence movement and a member of the Khudai Khidmatgars.

== Biography ==
Habibur Rahman was born in c. 1885 or c. 1900 in the Dragi village in Khost Province, Afghanistan to an ethnic Pashtun family. His father Malik Abdur Rahim emigrated from Afghanistan around 1914.

Kabuli was one of the main Pashtun figures against the British and has been reported to have been a member of the Indian National Congress. He also served as president of the Azad Pakhtoon Jirga-i Hind, and took part in the Quit India movement against the British Raj. Kabuli wrote several poems in praise of anti-British Indian nationalist figures.

Kabul died on 2 February 1988.

== Books ==
- Jai Hind
- Khuroosh-e-Ishq
- Tahreek-e-Khudai Khidmatgar
- Tahreek-e-Pakhtunistan
