= Syed Abul Farah Sani =

Islamic scholar

Hazrat Syed Abul Farah Sani Jajneri, Zaidi, Wasti
- سید ابوالفرح ثانی

Personal life
- Born: Syed Abul Farah Dharsul, Punjab
- Died: Dharsul, Punjab
- Home town: Jajneri, Patiala
- Region: Punjab
- Main interest: Sufism
- Posthumous name: Hazrat Abul Farah Sani Wasti
- Occupation: Orator

Religious life
- Religion: Islam
- Lineage: Zaidi Sayyid
- Jurisprudence: Hanafi
- Creed: Maturidi

Syed Abul Farah Sani bin Syed Abul Faras, popularly known as Abul Farah Sani, was an Islamic scholar, saint and Sufi. He was the grandson of Syed Abul Farah al-Wasti, who reached India from Wasit. He was a Zaidi Sadat and the second leader of Jajneri Sadaat, who resided in Jajneri village of Patiala. He is the ancestors of Sadaat of Bilgram and Sadaat of Marehra.

== Early life ==
His father came to India with his brothers, Syed Abul Fazail, Syed Daud and Syed Najmuddin in the leadership of his grandfather Syed Abul Farah al-Wasti from Wasit through Madina in the early 11th century.

He was named as Abul Farah, taken name from his grandfather but later added Sani means Second.
