= Aipan art =

Kumaoni folk art

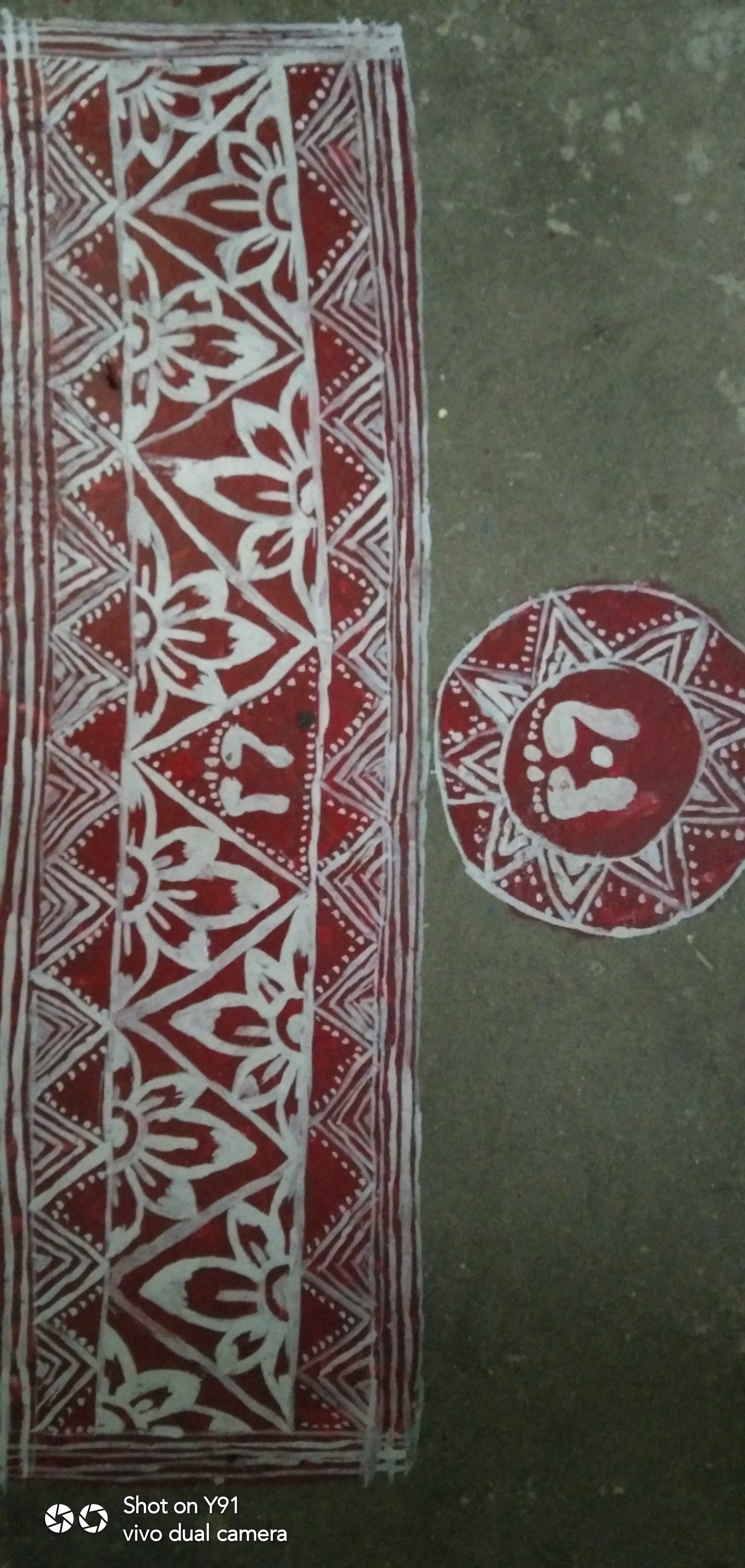
Aipan art drawn on the entrance of a house

Aipan (Kumaoni: Ēpaṇ) is an established-ritualistic folk art originating from Kumaon in the Indian Himalayas. The art is done mainly during special occasions, household ceremonies and rituals. Practitioners believe that it invokes a divine power which brings about good fortune and deters evil. The art is special as it is done on empty walls, which are brick-red in color, called Geru. The actual art is done with a white paste made of rice flour. The art is frequent to floors and walls of Puja rooms and entrances of homes. It is also practiced mostly by Kumaoni women. The art form has great social, cultural and religious importance.

== Practices ==
Aipan art is native to many different festivals, some of them are-

- Ganesh Chaturthi
- Makar Sankranti
- Kark Sankranti
- Maha Shivaratri
- Lakshmi Pujan

The art form is practised in different parts of India and known by different terms too. The art native to Kumaon is always done on a brick-red wall, which is also considered to be a symbol of fortune and fertility. Some of the motifs are Saraswati Chowki, Chamunda Hast Chowki, Nav Durga Chowki, Jyoti Patta, Durga Thapa and Lakshmi Yantra. The Aipan art is passed down through multiple generations from mothers to their daughters and daughter-in-laws. It was practised by women of all caste.

Aipan wall art in Dehradun, Uttarakhand

== Etymology ==
Aipan is taken from the word Lepana from Sanskrit, which means plaster. Aipan art is similar in different areas of India, it is also known by separate names.

- Aipan (in Kumaon)
- Alpona (in Bengal and Assam)
- Aripan (in Bihar and Uttar Pradesh)
- Mandana (in Rajasthan and Madhya Pradesh)
- Rangoli (in Gujarat and Maharashtra)
- Kolam (in South India)
- Muggu (in Andhra Pradesh)
- Alpana (in Chita, Jhoti and Muruja in Odisha)
- Bhuggul (in Andhra Pradesh)
- Likhnū/Chokā/Paṭhāh (in Himachal Pradesh)

== History ==
Aipan art originated from Almora in Uttarakhand, which was founded during the reign of the Chand dynasty. It flourished during the reign of the Chand dynasty in the Kumaon region. The designs and motifs are motivated by the beliefs of the community and various aspects from nature.

== Coverage and conservation ==
In December 2019, Minakshi Khati started Minakriti The Aipan Project, which aims to revive Aipan art. Under the project so far, 1000 orders have been placed. The project earns income for women from rural households in Kumaon. The project employs women from such households to who produce Aipans and deliver bulk orders to their clients.

Minakshi Khati has started Selfie with Aipan to encourage Aipan art among youth.

The Enactus students' team of Indraprastha College for Women (IPCW) started Project Aipan to strengthen the Aipan art form. The strategy was to make the artists stakeholders in the business by imparting them necessary business skills.

In order to protect domestic producers of various cultural and religious products like Aipan art, the Government of India set up the Uttarakhand Handloom & Handicraft Development Council (UHHDC) in 1860 under the Societies Registration Act, 1860. It aims at generating consistent employment opportunities by promoting the domestic art products.

The Uttarakhand Government, in 2015 decided that art depicting Aipan would be acquired for display in government offices and buildings. Some of the government buildings included Garhwal Mandal Vikas Nigam (GMVN), Kumaon Mandal Vikas Nigam (KMVN) and Uttarakhand Power Corporation Limited (UPCL). The decision was taken by the state tourism department headed by Harish Rawat.

Cheli Aipan is a government initiative, to promote the Aipan art form.

With an aim to promote the local art form of Uttarakhand and to encourage the artists, The Aipan Resort was established in Chopta, Rudraprayag, Uttarakhand. The resort aims at bringing the local art to a single place and practising its raw form. Formed by a team of young entrepreneurs, the resort has been much successful in promoting art even before the non-Uttarakhandi people.

== GI Tag ==
The Kumaoni folk art, I.e. Aipan received a GI Certificate in September 2021.

== Different Aipan arrangements ==
There are a number of different Aipan forms/motifs. Some of them are-

- Saraswati Chowki: Used to commemorate a child beginning his/her formal education.
- Chamunda Hast Chowki: It is made for auspicious or sacrificial fires.
- Nav Durga Chowki: Utilized for ritual Pujas. The art is made in such a way that there are 9 dots representing the Nav Durgas.
- Shivarchan Peeth: Applied whenever worship of Shiva, the ruling god takes place.
- Acharya Chowki: In popular Hinduism, the pandit/guru is considered more important than the groom. An important motif is made for the guru.

Other important forms are Asan Chowki, Durga Thapa, Jyoti Patta, Lakshmi Yantra, Janeyu Chowki and The Surya Darshan Chowki. The Shaukas have their own art form which is mixed between Tibetan and Kumaoni art forms. It is used to decorate mattresses known as Dans.

== See also ==
- Likhai - wood carving in Uttarakhand
