= Gulbahar Bano =

Pakistani ghazal singer

Gulbahar Bano گلبہار بانو PP
- Also known as: Gul Bahar Bano
- Born: Gulbahar Bano Begum; 1963 (age 62–63); Samma Satta, Bahawalpur, Pakistan
- Origin: Bahawalpur District, Punjab, Pakistan
- Genres: Ghazal
- Occupations: Singer; Playback singer; Folk singer; Ghazal singer
- Years active: 1972–present
- Labels: Radio Pakistan

Gulbahar Bano is a Pakistani ghazal singer. Gulbahar Bano's career was marked by a successful transition from Seraiki folk singer to one of Pakistan's most prominent ghazal vocalists. She started her singing career in the 1970s and early 1980s from Radio Pakistan, Bahawalpur station. Irfan Ali, station director of radio Pakistan Bahawalpur first gave her a chance on radio and then helped her move to Karachi. She rose to prominence in the 1970s and became one of the leading singers in the 1980s and 1990s. She moved to Karachi in the 1980s and shifted her focus from Kafi to ghazal singing. Later she moved to Lahore. She received the Presidential Pride of Performance, the highest literary award in Pakistan, in 2008.

== Early life ==
She was born in Samma Satta, Bahawalpur, Pakistan and she started singing at the age of ten. She was trained in singing by Ustad Mohammad Afzal Khan a classical singer. She began her singing career in the 1970s at the Radio Pakistan station in Bahawalpur.

== Career ==
Bano began her singing career at Radio Pakistan, Bahawalpur, where she initially focused on Seraiki kafi (Sufi devotional songs). With the support of Radio Pakistan's station director Irfan Ali then he told her to move to Karachi so she moved to Karachi and shifted her primary focus to ghazal singing. After moving to Karachi in the 1980s, she transitioned from singing kafi (Sufi devotional songs) to focusing on the ghazal tradition. She later moved to Lahore, continuing her work as a semi-classical and ghazal artist.

Bano gained widespread popularity for her powerful and melodic interpretations of ghazals. Her most famous rendition was "Chahat Mein Kya Duniyadari", "Ishq Mein Kaisi Majboori". Other notable tracks include "Le Ura Phir Koi Khayal Hamen" and "Udasiyon Ka Samaa".

In 1983, she sanged popular songs on Silver Jubilee Show on PTV and she also did playback singing in films.

Bano is most famous for her rendition of the ghazal, "Chahat Mein Kya Duniyadari, Ishq Mein Kaisi Majboori" (What is worldly convention in love, what helplessness is there in love). This iconic performance became her signature piece and resonated with audiences throughout the country.

She also recorded popular patriotic songs, such as "Woh Quaid-e-Azam". In recognition of her services to music, she was honored with the Presidential Pride of Performance, one of Pakistan's highest civilian awards, in 2008.

== Personal life ==
Gulbahar was married after sometime her husband died and she occasionally sings songs at her home.

== Filmography ==
=== Television ===
| Year | Title | Role | Network |
|---|---|---|---|
| 1981 | Mehfil-E-Mauseeqi | Herself | PTV |
| 1983 | Silver Jubilee | Herself | PTV |
| 1992 | Meray Naghmay | Herself | PTV |
| 1999 | Meri Pasand Season 2 | Herself | STN |

== Popular songs ==
- Chahat Mein Kia Dunya Dari, Ishq Mai Kesi Majbori - Poet: Mohsin Bhopali
- Hamain Jahan Mey
- Kya Kya Yeh Rang
- Dhal Gaye Raat
- Phir Kahan Mumkin
- Dard Kay Saaz
- Jayen Uss Gul Ke Taraf
- Kabhi Kabhi To
- Udasiyuon Ka Saman
- Tu Paas Bhi Ho To
- Toh Kya Ye Tey Hai Ke Ab Umar Bhar Naheen Milna
- Saagar Roye Lehrien Shor Machayein

== Awards and recognition ==
| Year | Award | Category | Result | Title | Ref. |
|---|---|---|---|---|---|
| 2008 | Pride of Performance | Award by the President of Pakistan | Won | Arts | |
