= Takhallus =

Pen name

In Persian, Kurdish, Pashto, Turkic, Hindustani (Hindi-Urdu), Kashmiri, Sindhi and Punjabi, the word takhallus (from Arabic: تخلّص, lit. 'to get liberated or to become secure'; Persian: تخلّص, romanized: taxallus; Azerbaijani: təxəllüs; Uzbek: taxallus; Urdu: تخلّص, Hindi: तख़ल्लुस, Punjabi: Gurmukhi: ਤਖ਼ੱਲੁਸ, Shahmukhi: تخلّص) means a pen name. Pen names were widely adopted by Persian, Turkic, Hindustani (Hindi-Urdu) and Punjabi poets.

The takhallus is often included in the maqta', the last couplet (bayt) of a ghazal.

== History and usage ==
In classical Arabic literature and rhetoric, the term takhallus (Arabic: تخلّص, lit. 'freeing oneself, transition') originally refers to the seamless thematic transition from the opening prelude (nasīb) of a qasida (ode) to its primary subject, typically praise (madīḥ). The masterful execution of this transition is highly regarded in Arabic prosody and is termed ḥusn at-takhalluṣ (good transition).

When the ghazal later evolved into a fully independent poetic form, Persian and subsequently Urdu authors adopted and redefined the term. In the Persianate tradition, takhallus evolved to mean the poet's adopted pen name. It became a formalized structural convention for the poet to weave this pen name into the maqta' (the concluding couplet) of the poem.

== Examples of takhallus ==
(Note that many of the following poets wrote in multiple languages, and not exclusively in the language they are categorised under.)

Examples of takhallus and laqab used by some notable Arabic poets:

- Al-Khansa'
- Al-Mutannabi
- Abu Nuwas
- Ziryab
- al-Ghazal
- Abu Tammam

Examples of takhallus used by some notable Azeri and Persian poets:

- Suman - Attar of Nishapur
- Hafez
- Jami
- Khamushn - Rumi
- Saadi
- Ashfaq Attari - Fani Badayuni
- Mahsati
- Nizami
- Nasimi
- Fuzuli
- Ferdowsi
- Khaqani
- Khaṭāʾī - Shah Ismail I of Safavid Iran

Examples of takhallus used by some notable Hindustani (Hindi-Urdu) and Punjabi poets, and other Islamicate poets of the Indian Subcontinent:

- Bulleh Shah
- Faiz – Faiz Ahmed Faiz
- Fani — Fani Badayuni, Shaukat Ali Khan
- Ghalib – Mirza Asadullah Baig Khan
- Hali – Altaf Hussain Hali
- Jigar - Jigar Moradabadi, Sikander Ali Moradabadi
- Kabir
- Kaki - Khwaja Qutbuddin Bakhtiar Kaki
- Makhfi - Zeb-un-Nissa
- Mir - Mir Muhammad Taqi Mir
- Raskhan
- Zafar - Bahadur Shah Zafar, Bahadur Shah II

Examples of takhallus used by some notable Turkish poets:

- Muhibbi - Suleiman the Magnificent
- Bâkî
- Nedîm
- Fuzuli
- Üftade
- Nef'i
- Mevhibe - Şerife Fatma "Mevhibe" Hanım

Among Hindustani (Hindi-Urdu), Kashmiri, Sindhi and Punjabi poets, "Hasrat" is a particularly common takhallus, wherein the word also has meanings "wish" or "desire,", deriving from the Arabic hasra (حسرة). It is also the Persian, Hindustani (Hindi-Urdu), Kashmiri, Sindhi and Punjabi variant pronunciation of the Islamic honorific haḍra (Arabic: حضرة).

== See also ==
- List of pseudonyms
  - List of pen names
- Kunya, Laqab, and Nisba
