= Hadra (word) =

Arabic honorific title

The Arabic word ḥaḍra (حضرة, lit. 'presence'; construct state: حضرة ḥaḍrat; plural: حضرات ḥaḍrāt), and its derivatives in languages of the Persianate world (Persian: حضرت, romanized: ḥażrat; Azerbaijani: həzrət; Turkish: hazret; Urdu: حضرت, romanized: ḥażrat; Uzbek: hazrat) are used to form various styles in the Arab world, Iran (as well as in Persianate settings), the Republic of Azerbaijan, Turkey, Afghanistan, Central Asia (i.e., the Greater Iran) and South Asia. In Urdu, the term has also come to be formally used to refer to a male in general, such as in the literary phrase xawātīn ō ḥażrāt (Urdu: خواتین و حضرات, romanized: xawātīn ō ḥażrāt, lit. 'ladies and gentlemen').

== Syntax ==
In Arabic styles, the word حضرة ḥaḍra is used in its construct state (حضرة ḥaḍrat), followed by a possessive suffix (e.g. حضرتك ḥaḍratuka for a man or ḥaḍratuki for a woman) or by a noun in the genitive case (e.g. حضرة الأستاذ ḥaḍratu l-ʾustāḏi for a male professor or حضرة الأستاذة ḥaḍratu l-ʾustāḏati for a female professor). In Persian styles, the word حضرت ḥażrat is typically used with an ezāfe followed by the complement (e.g. حضرتِ […] ḥażrat-i […]). In Turkish styles, the word hazret may be found in the plural with possessive form, as an honorary suffix (e.g. […] Hazretleri).

== Usage ==
The title is used for the prophets of the Islamic faith in Arabic, Persian, Pashto, Chagatai, Urdu, etc. The twenty-five great Hazrat include Muhammad, Abraham, Noah, Moses, and Jesus. It carries connotations of the charismatic and is comparable to traditional English honorifics addressing high officials, such as "Your Honour" (for judges), "Your Majesty" (for monarchs), or "Your Holiness" (for clerics).

This word may sometimes also appear after the names of respected Muslims, such as imams, sheikhs, and ulama e.g. Turkish Hazretleri ('his Hadrat') in Islamic culture. This is similar to the French honorifics Monsieur and Madame, Sanskrit honorifics Śrī and Śrimatī, and Japanese honorific Sama. The term was also loaned by Turkish into Albanian and Bosnian as Hazreti. In Urdu, the term is formally used to refer to a male in general, such as in the literary phrase xawātīn o ḥażrāt (خواتین و حضرات, transl. 'women and men'), while banda (بندہ) is more common in informal contexts.

The term is not exclusively used by Muslims, as Arabic and Persian-speaking Bahá'ís also use the term to refer to individuals of religious significance, such as prophets and their successors.

Hasrat (the Persianate pronunciation of ḥaḍra) is a common takhallus (pen name) for Muslim poets in the Indian subcontinent.

== See also ==
- A'la-Hazrat
