= Gulbahar Begum =

Sikh Empire queen consort (d. 1863)

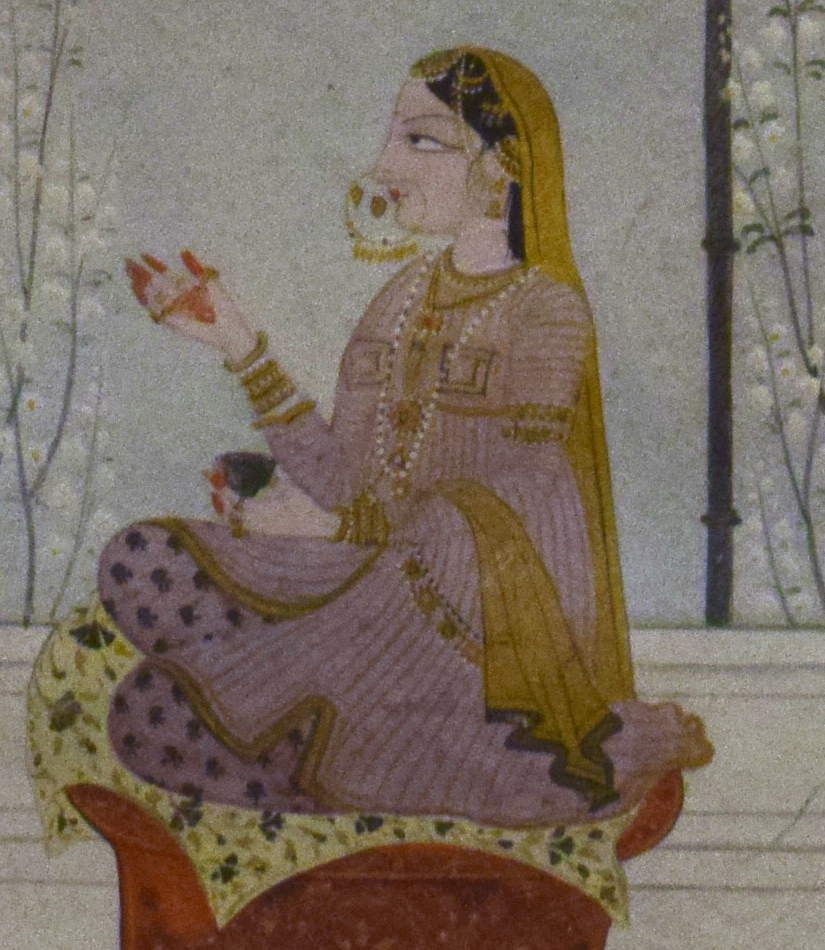
Gul Bahar Begum, a Muslim wife of Maharaja Ranjit Singh, detail of a painting Raja Ranjit Singh with a noble lady

Maharani Gulbahar Begum (died 1863) was a wife of Maharaja Ranjit Singh of the Sikh Empire.

== Life ==
Gul Begum was a Kashmiri Muslim dancing girl from Amritsar. Ranjit Singh, on seeing her dance at Ropar, became captivated with her.

They married in 1833. Prior to the wedding there was opposition from orthodox quarters, who demanded that she needed to convert to Sikhism. The Maharaja however resisted, and she remained a Muslim. At the wedding she was dressed in yellow garments, a gold nosering with a pearl was fixed to her nose, her hands and feet were dyed red in henna and she was bedecked in gold ornaments studded with diamonds. As part of the wedding celebrations, her brothers were granted a jagir and given a nawabi title.

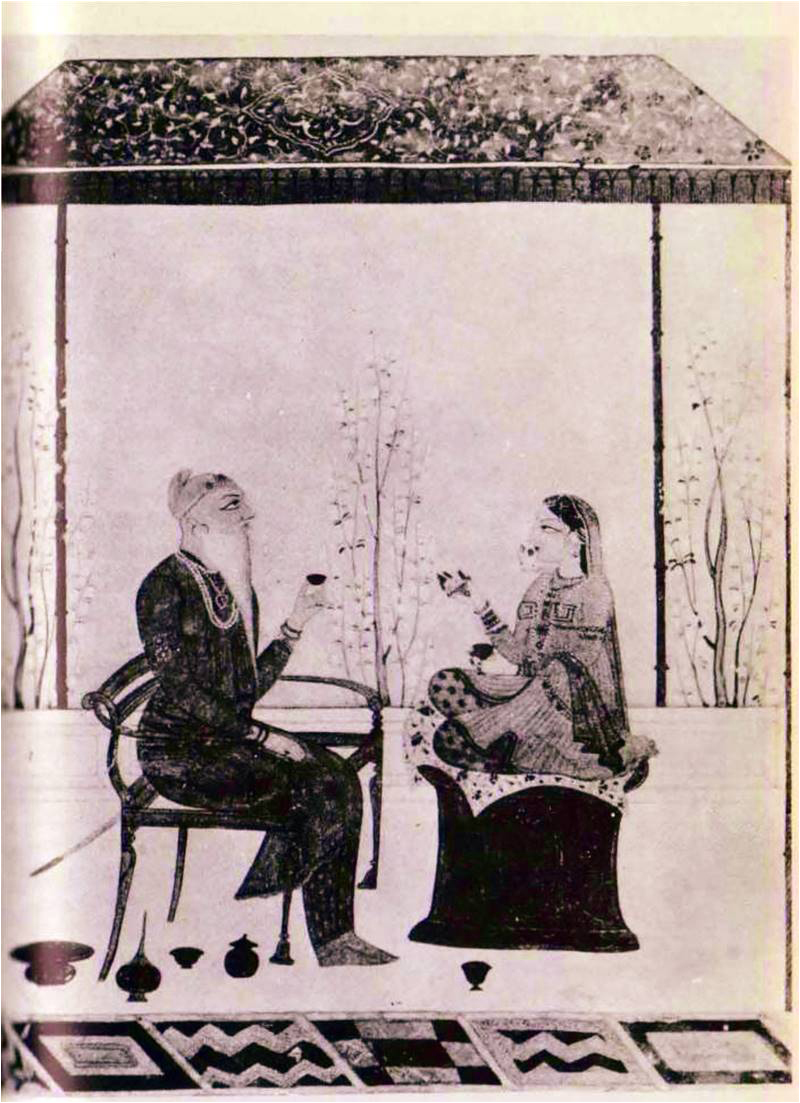
Painting of Maharaja Ranjit Singh with a noble lady, possibly Gul Begum, ca.1830–35

After their wedding, Ranjit Singh renamed her Maharani Gulbahar Begum and elevated her to a position above the other courtly women, who were now tasked with massaging her feet. She did not observe purdah and was often seen on the royal elephant with the Maharaja during processions. She was given a haveli between Rang Mahal and Haveli Mian Khan, also known as Haveli Barood Khana.

When the Maharaja died in 1839 she offered herself for sati, however was advised by a courtier that this was forbidden in Islam. After the British annexed the Punjab in 1849 she was granted a pension of Rs. 12,380 for the remainder of her life. In later life she adopted a son, Sardar Khan, who cared for her. She spent her final years in the Miani Sahib area, where she built a garden and mosque. She died at Lahore in 1863.
