= Likhai =

Woodcarving tradition in Uttarakhand, India

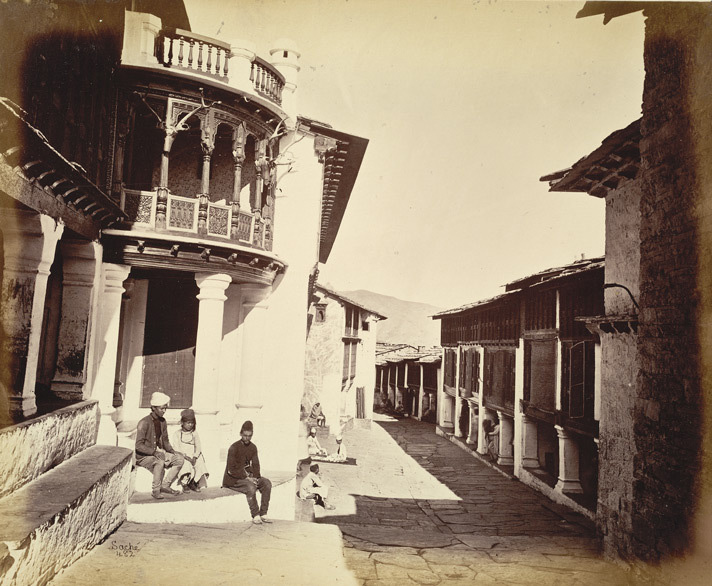
Likhai wood carving on the columns as seen in c.1860 in Almora Bazaar, Uttarakhand.

Likhai (Hindi for 'writing') refers to the ancient woodcarving tradition of Uttarakhand, a North Indian mountain state. Given the rapid urbanization in the region and migration of artisans to larger cities for more lucrative jobs, the craft is said to be on the verge of "vanishing".

== History and practice ==
There are no texts recording the history of the craft, and the skills and knowledge are passed down practically through apprenticeships. The motifs carved on windows, pillars or doorframes include: local flora and fauna, folklores, religious symbols, geometric patterns.
