= Hasrat =

Popular pen name used by Urdu poets

Hasrat is a popular name predominantly used in South Asia. It is also a popular pen name for Urdu poets in Pakistan. In Urdu, the word Hasrat meaning "wish" or "desire,", deriving from the Arabic hasra (حسرة). It is also the Persian and Hindustani pronunciation of the Islamic honorific hadra (Arabic: حضرة). Notable Urdu poets that use this pen name include: Muhammad Abdul Qadeer Siddiqi Qadri 'Hasrat' (1871–1962), Hasrat Jaipuri (1922-1977) and Hasrat Mohani (1875-1951).

An Indian revolutionary Ashfaqulla Khan (1900-1927) also used to write Urdu poetry with this pen name; the full name of Ashfaq was Mohammad Ashfaqulla Khan Warsi 'Hasrat'. His popular couplet "zindagi (زندگی ) baad-e-fanaa tujhko milegii 'Hasrat', Teraa jiinaa tere marne ki badault hogaa." (en: O Hasrat! thou would get real life after thy death, Thou shall live in the hearts of people after thy sacrifice.)
