= Rahmatullah Dard =

Pashto poet (1937–2016)

Rahmat Ullah Dard
- Born: 4 December 1937; British India
- Died: 31 August 2016; Lakki Marwat, Khyber Pakhtunkhwa Pakistan
- Occupation(s): Professor of Urdu Literature; Poet
- Children: 5 daughters (Alive) and 1 son who passed away back in 1990s

Rahmat Ullah Dard (1937-2016), was a Pashto-language ghazal poet. He died at the age of 82. He was a famous Pashto Poet and has rendered extraordinary contributions to the language of Pashto. Ahmed Jan Marwat has penned down a book on both Rahmatullah Dard and Abdur Rahim Majzoob poetry. He has carried out a comparative analysis of their poetry. Said Ul Amin Ahsan Kheshgi has written down an article about the poetry and life of Professor Rahmatullah Dard. Dard also wrote poetry in Urdu.

== Books ==
He wrote the following notable books: Apart from that, all these books are incorporated in a single book named as "Da Dard Kulyat"

- Ghazal
- Dard
- Muntakhib Dard
- Wafa
- Noon na tar Noon
- Hagha Stargy che Ghagegi
- Wyal Sarhi
