= Maqta' =

The maqta' (from Arabic: مقطع maqṭaʿ, literally 'the place of cutting' or 'ending'; Persian: مقطع; Azerbaijani: məqtə; Turkish: makta; Uzbek: maqta; Urdu: مقطع) is a classical prosodic term referring to the concluding verse or section of a poem.

In the ghazal traditions of Persian, Turkic, and Urdu literature, the maqta' specifically designates the final bayt (couplet) of the poem. It serves as the structural and conceptual opposite of the matla' (the opening couplet).

A defining characteristic of the maqta' in these specific traditions is the inclusion of the poet's takhallus (pen name), which the poet weaves into the verse, often to address themselves, make a concluding statement, or add a personal signature to the work.

== Examples ==
A sher by Mir Taqi Mir:

Mir in neem baaz aankhon mein

Saari masti sharaab ki see hai

Another by Mirza Ghalib:

Kaba kis munh se jaaoge Ghalib

sharm tum ko magar nahiN aati

Another by Nasir kazmi:

Itefaqaat zamaana bhi ajab hai Nasir

Aaj woh dekh rahe hai, ko suna karte the

== See also ==
- Takhallus
- Ghazal
- Urdu poetry
- Matla'
