= Adil Gulbahar =

Pakistani cricketer (born 1985)

Adil Gulbahar عادل گلبہار
Personal information
- Full name: Adil Gulbahar
- Born: 23 March 1985 (age 41); Azad Kashmir, Pakistan
- Batting: Right-handed
- Bowling: Right-arm off spinner
- Role: Opening batsman

Domestic team information
- Years: Team
- 2012/13: Rawalpindi
- 2014/15: AJK Jaguars

Career statistics
Competition	FC	T20
Matches	1	3
Runs scored	15	47
Batting average	7.50	15.66
100s/50s	0/0	0/0
Top score	9	28
Balls bowled	–	–
Wickets	–	–
Bowling average	–	–
5 wickets in innings	–	–
10 wickets in match	–	–
Best bowling	–	–
Catches/stumpings	0/–	2/–
- Source: ESPNcricinfo, 4 July 2022

Adil Gulbahar (Urdu: عادل گلبہار) (born 23 March 1985 in Azad Kashmir), is a Pakistani cricketer.

== Domestic career ==
=== First-class career ===
Gulbahar made his first-class debut for Rawalpindi against Lahore Shalimar in the 2012–13 Quaid-e-Azam Trophy on 19 January 2013. He scored 9 (17) in the first innings and scored 6 (23) in the second innings. Rawalpindi won the match by 24 runs.

=== T20 career ===
Gulbahar made his T20 debut for AJK Jaguars against Islamabad Leopards in the 2014–15 National T20 Cup. He scored 16 (14). Islamabad won the match by 34 runs. Gulbahar played his next match against Faisalabad Wolves. He scored 28 (37). Faisalabad won the match by 8 wickets. Gulbahar played his last match of the tournament against Lahore Eagles. He scored 3 (9). Lahore won by 7 wickets.
