= Qafiya =

Rhyme in classical Arabic poetry

Qāfiya (from Arabic: قافية qāfiya, lit. 'rhyme'; Persian: قافیہ; Azerbaijani: qafiyə; Urdu: قافیہ; Uzbek: qofiya) is the classical Islamic prosodic term for rhyme.

Originating as a foundational element of classical Arabic poetry, the qāfiya establishes the rhyming pattern at the end of a poetic verse. When this concept was later adapted into the ghazal traditions of Persian, Turkic, and Urdu literature, it retained its core function as the primary rhyme. However, in these specific non-Arabic traditions, if a poem utilizes a radif (a repeating word or phrase at the very end of the line), the qāfiya must directly precede it.
