= Chaar Bayt =

Traditional performing art of India

Chaar Bayt is a 400-year-old traditional performing art, performed by a group of artists or singers. Chaar Bayt or Four Stanzas is a form of folklore and performing art. It is still alive today mainly in Rampur (Uttar Pradesh), Tonk (Rajasthan), Bhopal (Madhya Pradesh) and Hyderabad of Telangana (erstwhile Andhra Pradesh). Sangeet Natak Academy recognized it as a traditional folk art form.

== Origin ==
The poetic form traces back to the 7th century in Arabia with the name Rajeez. The origin of the word "Chaar Bayt" can be traced back to the Persian language where it refers to a four-stanzas poetry in which each stanza is composed of four lines. The poetry is sung accompanied by Daf, a percussion instrument of Arab origin. This art form came from Persia to India via Afghanistan. The widely accepted source is the Afghani soldiers in the Mughal army brought this art to India.

== Composition ==
Earlier, it was composed in Persian and Pashtu, however, later it came to be composed in Urdu also. The form gradually became embedded in local culture and began to borrow its idiom from the folk. The "Chaar Bayt" poetry exudes the same sensuousness as the Urdu Ghazal.

== Present artists groups ==
- Babban Sultani performing group from Rampur in Uttar Pradesh.
- Badshah Khan and troupe from Tonk in Rajasthan.
- Masood Hashmi and troupe from Bhopal in Madhya Pradesh.
- Some local troupes from Hyderabad of Telangana.

== Theme of the art ==
Usually, "Chaar Bayt" is a long poem with a chain of four stanzas describing wars, bravery, romance and sometimes spirituality. In earlier periods it has a Sufi mystic spiritual theme, later socio-political issues became the dominant subjects of the theme.
