= Radif =

Element of Persian, Turkic, and Urdu ghazals

In the poetic traditions of the Islamic East, particularly in Persian, Turkic, and Urdu ghazals, the radīf (from the Arabic linguistic root رديف, meaning 'the one riding behind') refers to a specific word or short phrase that must consistently end each line of the opening couplet and the second line of all subsequent couplets.

Structurally, the radīf strictly follows the qafiya, which serves as the actual rhyming syllable of the poem.

For instance, if a poet chooses a specific rhyme (qafiya) followed by a set word like "in" (the radīf), every required line in the ghazal will end with "[rhyming word] in". This creates a dual layer of repetition at the end of the verses.

In literary terminology, a ghazal structured with this repeating word is classified as a muraddaf ghazal. Conversely, a poem that relies solely on the standard qafiya without a repeating radīf is known as a ghair muraddaf ghazal.
