= Bahr (poetry) =

Meter in Arabic, Persian, Turkic and Urdu poetry

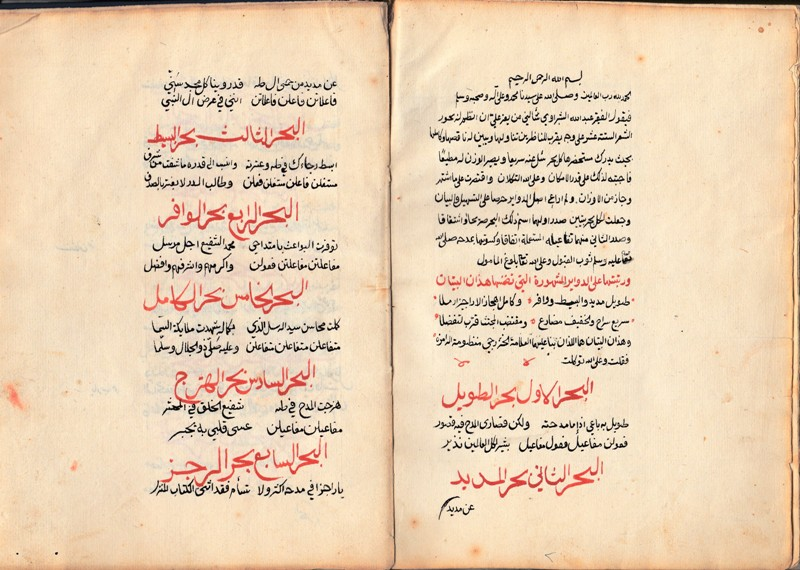
an old manuscript in Arabic poetry, in 1841 (1)

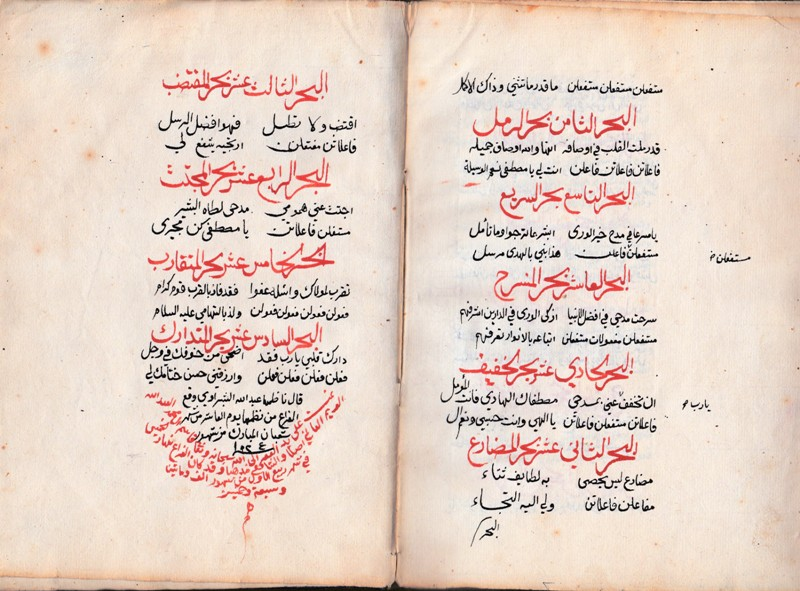
an old Manuscript in Arabic poetry, in 184jp1 (2)

A baḥr (from Arabic: بحر, lit. 'sea'; Persian: بحر; Azerbaijani: bəhr; Turkish: bahir; Urdu: بحر; Uzbek: bahr) refers to the poetic meter used in Arabic, Persian, Turkic, and Urdu poetry.

The concept and system of baḥr were originally formulated for Arabic poetry in the 8th century by Arab philologist Al-Khalil ibn Ahmad al-Farahidi, who established the foundational rules of Arabic prosody (ʿarūḍ).

Essentially, a bahr is a specific rhythmic pattern defined by the sequence of basic metrical feet (tafāʿīl or arkān). While originating in the Arabic linguistic tradition, this metrical framework was later adopted by other literary traditions in the Islamic world, such as Persian and Urdu.

In classical Arabic poetry, the bahr is determined by the specific sequence of consonants and vowels, grouped into basic metrical feet known as tafāʿīl (تفاعيل). Al-Khalil initially identified 15 standard meters, such as al-Ṭawīl, al-Kāmil, and al-Basīṭ, mapping the rhythmic structures used by pre-Islamic Arabs. A 16th meter (al-Mutadārik) was later formalized by his student Al-Akhfash al-Akbar. Each meter creates a distinct rhythmic signature that defines the musicality of the poem.

== Adaptation in Urdu and Persian ==
When the bahr system was adopted into non-Arabic literary traditions, the fundamental Arabic feet were maintained but adapted to the phonetic realities of Indo-Iranian languages.

For a ghazal, since all the shers in it should be of the same bahr, determining the bahr of one sher (or even one line of the sher) is enough to determine the bahr of the entire ghazal. For example, in this ghazal of Ghalib, the length and meter of the ashaar is same throughout. In terms of the European method of scansion, the metre can be written as follows (where "x" = long or short, "u" = short, "–" = long, "u u" = one long or two short syllables):

x u – – u – u – u u –

koii ummiid bar nahiin aatii
koii suurat nazar nahiin aatii

aage aatii thii haal-e-dil pe hansii
ab kisii baat par nahiin aatii

jaanataa huun savaab-e-taa'at-o-zahad
par tabiiyat idhar nahiin aatii

hai kuchh aisii hii baat jo chup huun
varna kyaa baat kar nahiin aatii

kaabaa kis muunh se jaaoge 'Ghaalib'
sharm tum^{a}ko magar nahiin aatii

The ghazal above is written in a bahr called: khafiif musaddas makhbuun mahzuuf maqtu (Meter G8). This is a ten-syllable bahr and by the standards of Urdu poetry, is a chotii (small) bahr.

As with the scansion of Persian poetry, a syllable such as miid or baat consisting of a long vowel plus consonant, or sharm consisting of a short vowel and two consonants, is "overlong", and counts as a long syllable + a short one.

In Urdu prosody, unlike Persian, any final long vowel can be shortened as the metre requires, for example, in the word kaabaa in the last verse above.

== Taqṭīʿ (Scansion) ==
Taqṭīʿ (Arabic: تقطيع, lit. 'cutting into pieces') is the classical process of prosodic scansion. It involves breaking down the verses of a poem into their fundamental phonetic syllables and matching them against the standard metrical feet (tafāʿīl in Arabic, or arkaan in Urdu/Persian) to determine or verify the poem's bahr.

In this process, syllables are weighed based on their consonant-vowel structure (vazn) to ensure a consistent rhythmic pattern throughout the poem. This analytical method is fundamental to classical Arabic prosody and is equally applied in Persian and Urdu poetry forms like the ghazal.

== Types of bahr ==
Historically, the foundational Arabic prosody system identified 16 primary meters. These were standardized by Al-Khalil ibn Ahmad (who categorized 15) and his student Al-Akhfash (who formalized the 16th, al-Mutadārik). The standard Arabic meters are:

- al-Ṭawīl (الطويل)
- al-Madīd (المديد)
- al-Basīṭ (البسيط)
- al-Wāfir (الوافر)
- al-Kāmil (الكامل)
- al-Hazaj (الهزج)
- al-Rajaz (الرجز)
- al-Ramal (الرمل)
- al-Sarīʿ (السريع)
- al-Munsariḥ (المنسرح)
- al-Khafīf (الخفيف)
- al-Muḍāriʿ (المضارع)
- al-Muqtaḍab (المقتضب)
- al-Mujtathth (المجتث)
- al-Mutaqārib (المتقارب)
- al-Mutadārik (المتدارك)

Additions in Persian and Urdu: When the bahr system was adapted for Indo-Iranian languages, prosodists introduced additional meters to accommodate the phonetic differences and specific rhythmic needs of Persian and Urdu poetry. This expansion brought the total number of commonly recognized meters in the Urdu tradition to 19. The non-Arabic meters typically include:

- baHr-e-mushaakil (المشاكل)
- baHr-e-jadeed (الجديد)
- baHr-e-qareeb (القريب)

== Bibliography ==
- Deo, Ashwini; Kiparsky, Paul (2011). "Poetries in Contact: Arabic, Persian, and Urdu". In Maria-Kristina Lotman and Mihhail Lotman ed. Proceedings of International Conference on Frontiers in Comparative Metrics, Estonia, pp. 147–173.
- Pritchett, Frances W. (1993). "Orient Pearls Unstrung: The Quest for Unity in the Ghazal". Edebiyât vol. NS 4, pp. 119–135.
- Pritchett, Frances. "A Desert Full of Roses - The Urdu Ghazals of Mirza Assadullah Khan Ghalib".
- Thiesen, Finn (1982). A Manual of Classical Persian Prosody, with chapters on Urdu, Karakhanidic and Ottoman prosody. Wiesbaden.
