= Wives of Ranjit Singh =

Maharaja's wives and concubines

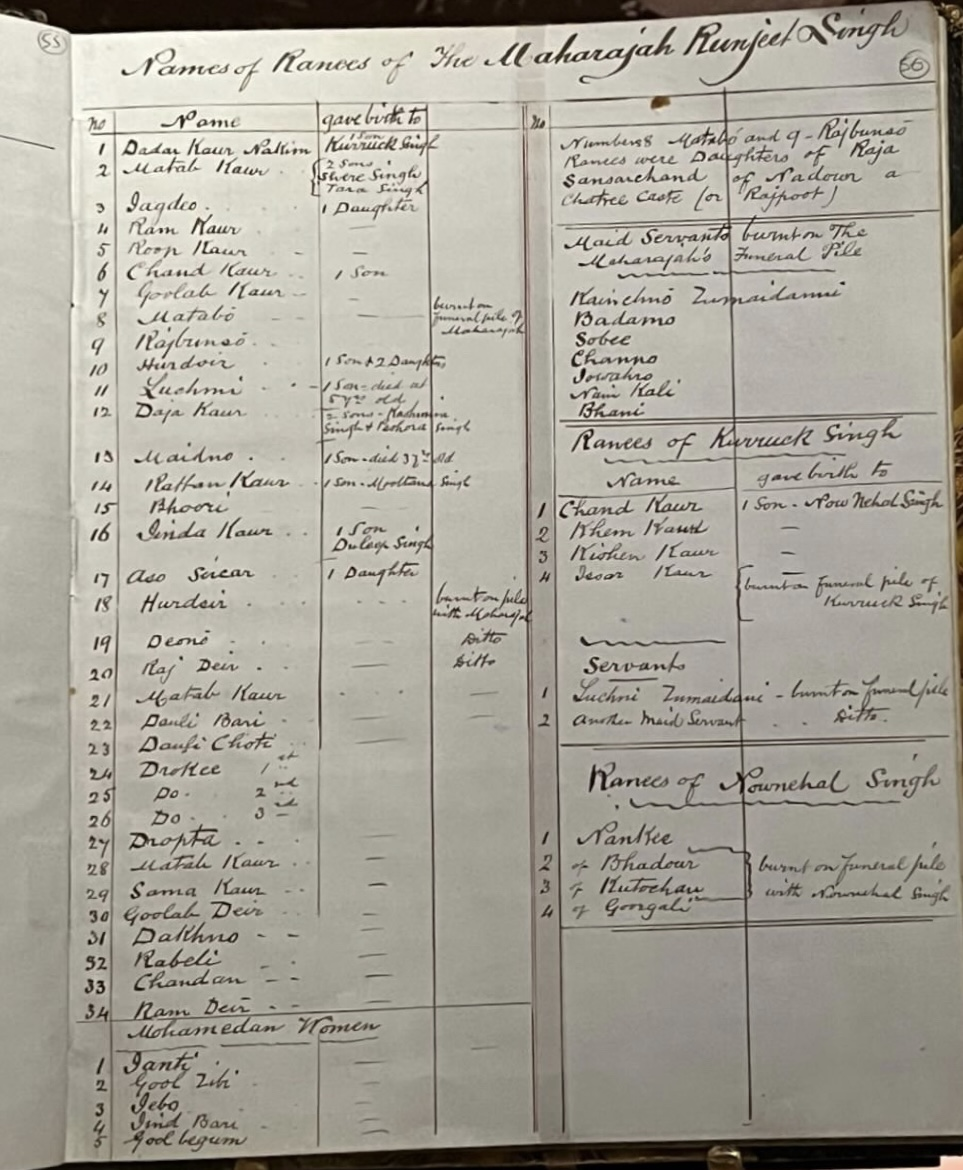
Genealogical notes on Sikh emperors from the Lahore Durbar, focusing on their wives and children, from the personal notebook and copybook of Duleep Singh, ca.1855–60. The many wives of Ranjit Singh and their children are enumerated.

Maharaja Ranjit Singh had many wives, possibly around thirty. Furthermore, he kept a company of around twenty-three concubines and a 150 dancing-girls, mostly from Kashmir and the Punjab Hills. The numerous wives were of various ethnic backgrounds, such as Punjabi, Pashtun, and Pahari, and also various caste-backgrounds, such as Jatt, Rajput, and Gujjar. The marriages initially helped strengthen the Sukerchakia Misl and later the Sikh Empire, due to marital-alliances to various groups. After Ranjit Singh provided help to Sansar Chand of Kangra against the invading Gurkhas, he married two of the Kangra ruler's daughters. At-least five of his wives were Muslim.

Recent scholarship has argued that historians' focus on the Maharaja has hidden the political role of "the ruling women and young princes of Ranjit Singh's new royal house", who in fact had a strong influence on the Sikh Empire. A 2021 novel by Chitra Banerjee Divakaruni titled The Last Queen tells the story of Ranjit Singh's last wife, Jind Kaur, and interweaves stories of the other wives in the zenana, including Rani Guddan, Chand Kaur and Pathani.

== Overview ==
In 1789, Ranjit Singh married his first wife Mehtab Kaur, the muklawa happened in 1796. She was the only daughter of Gurbaksh Singh Kanhaiya and his wife Sada Kaur. She was the granddaughter of Jai Singh Kanhaiya, the founder of the Kanhaiya Misl. This marriage was pre-arranged in an attempt to reconcile warring Sikh misls, Mehtab Kaur was betrothed to Ranjit Singh in 1786. The marriage, however, failed, with Mehtab Kaur never forgiving the fact that her father had been killed in battle with Ranjit Singh's father, and she mainly resided with her mother after marriage. The separation became complete when Ranjit Singh married Datar Kaur of the Nakai Misl in 1797 and she turned into Ranjit's most beloved wife. Mehtab Kaur had three sons, Ishar Singh who was born in 1804 and died in infancy. In 1807 she had Sher Singh and Tara Singh. According to historian Jean-Marie Lafont, she was the only one to bear the title of Maharani. She died in 1813, after suffering from failing health.

His second marriage was to, Datar Kaur (Born Raj Kaur) the youngest child of Ran Singh Nakai, the third ruler of the Nakai Misl and his wife Karman Kaur. They were betrothed in childhood by Datar Kaur's eldest brother, Sardar Bhagwan Singh, who briefly became the chief of the Nakai Misl, and Ranjit Singh's father Maha Singh. They were married in 1797; this marriage was a happy one and Ranjit Singh always treated Raj Kaur with love and respect. Fakir Waheeduddin in his family's memoir writes that Raj Kaur brought sweetness and light into Ranjit Singh's life. Since Raj Kaur was also the name of Ranjit Singh's mother, his wife was renamed to Datar Kaur. The name Datar means 'Giver' it was chosen for her due to her charitable and gentle nature.

In 1801, she gave birth to their son and heir apparent, Kharak Singh. Like his first marriage, the second marriage also brought him a strategic military alliance. Along with wisdom and all the chaste virtues of a royal woman, Datar Kaur was exceptionally intelligent and assisted Ranjit Singh in affairs of the State. During the expedition to Multan in 1818, she was given command alongside her son, Kharak Singh.

It is widely recognized that Datar Kaur had a great amount of influence on Ranjit Singh. Throughout his life she remained Ranjit Singh's favorite wife and for no one did he have greater respect than for Datar Kaur, who he affectionately called Mai Nakain.

Even though she was his second wife she became his principal wife and chief consort. During a hunting trip with Ranjit Singh, she fell ill and died on 20 June 1838. The missionary reported on her death,

"The Maharajah was never the same person again. He was no longer able to mount his horse himself and had to be lifted into the saddle. His recovery was retarded by the death of Mai Nakain, his favourite wife and companion of over forty years . He took the Nakain's death to heart and brooded over it a long time"

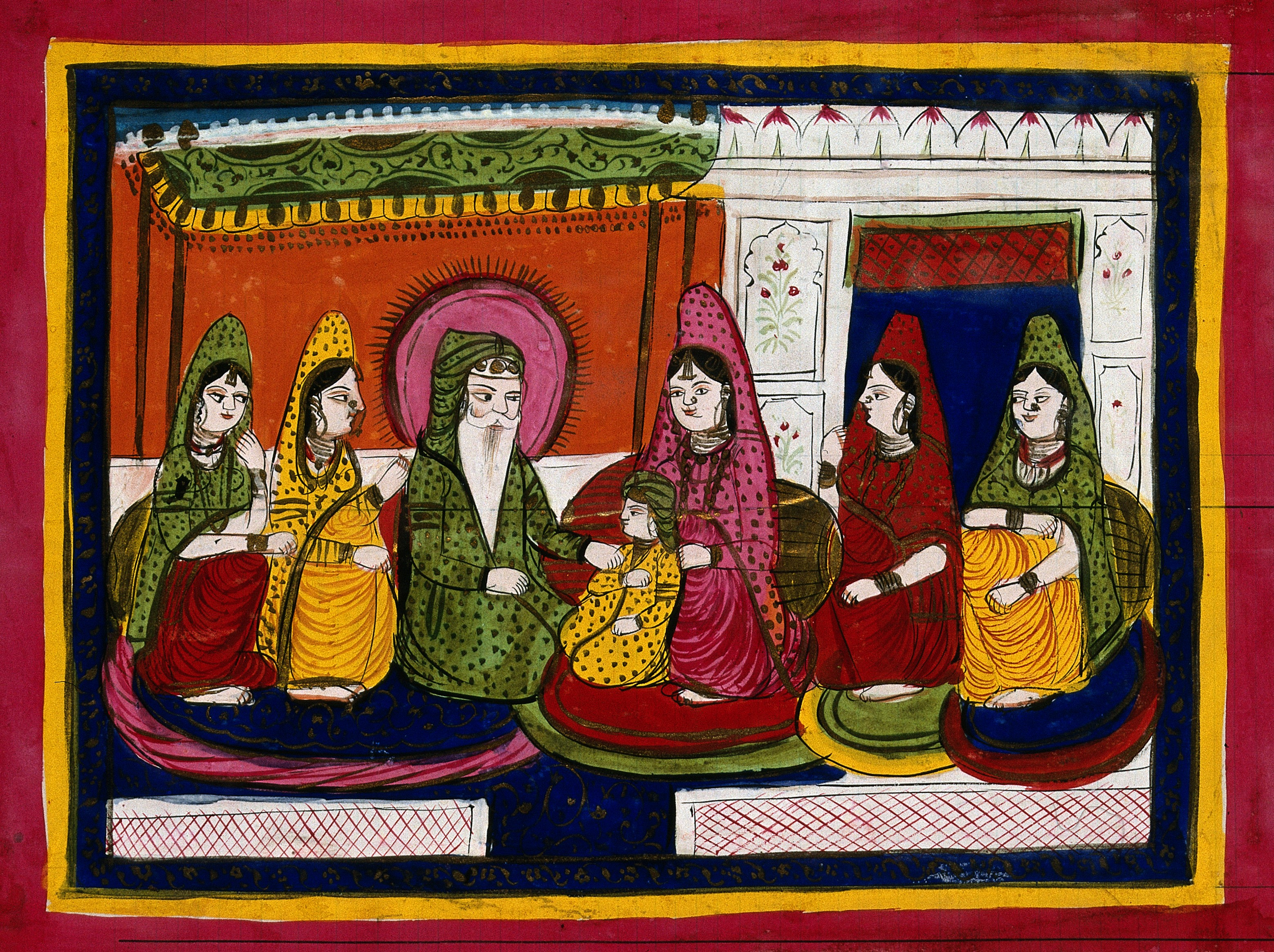
Maharaja Ranjit Singh with some of his wives.

Ratan Kaur and Daya Kaur were wives of Sahib Singh Bhangi of Gujrat (a misl north of Lahore, not to be confused with the state of Gujarat). After Sahib Singh's death, Ranjit Singh took them under his protection in 1811 by marrying them via the rite of chādar andāzī, in which a cloth sheet was unfurled over each of their heads. The same with Roop Kaur, Gulab Kaur, Saman Kaur, and Lakshmi Kaur who looked after Duleep Singh when his mother Jind Kaur was exiled. Ratan Kaur had a son Multana Singh in 1819, and Daya Kaur had two sons Kashmira Singh and Pashaura Singh in 1821.

Jind Kaur, the final spouse of Ranjit Singh. Her father, Manna Singh Aulakh, extolled her virtues to Ranjit Singh, who was concerned about the frail health of his only heir Kharak Singh. The Maharaja married her in 1835 by 'sending his arrow and sword to her village'. On 6 September 1838 she gave birth to Duleep Singh, who became the last Maharaja of the Sikh Empire.

His other wives included, Mehtab Devi of Kangara also called Guddan or Katochan and Raj Banso, daughters of Raja Sansar Chand of Kangra.

He was also married to Rani Har Devi of Atalgarh, Rani Aso Sircar and Rani Jag Deo According to the diaries, that Duleep Singh kept towards the end of his life, these women presented the Maharaja with four daughters. Dr. Priya Atwal notes that the daughters could be adopted. Ranjit Singh was also married to Jind Bani or Jind Kulan, daughter of Muhammad Pathan from Mankera and Gul Bano, daughter of Malik Akhtar from Amritsar.

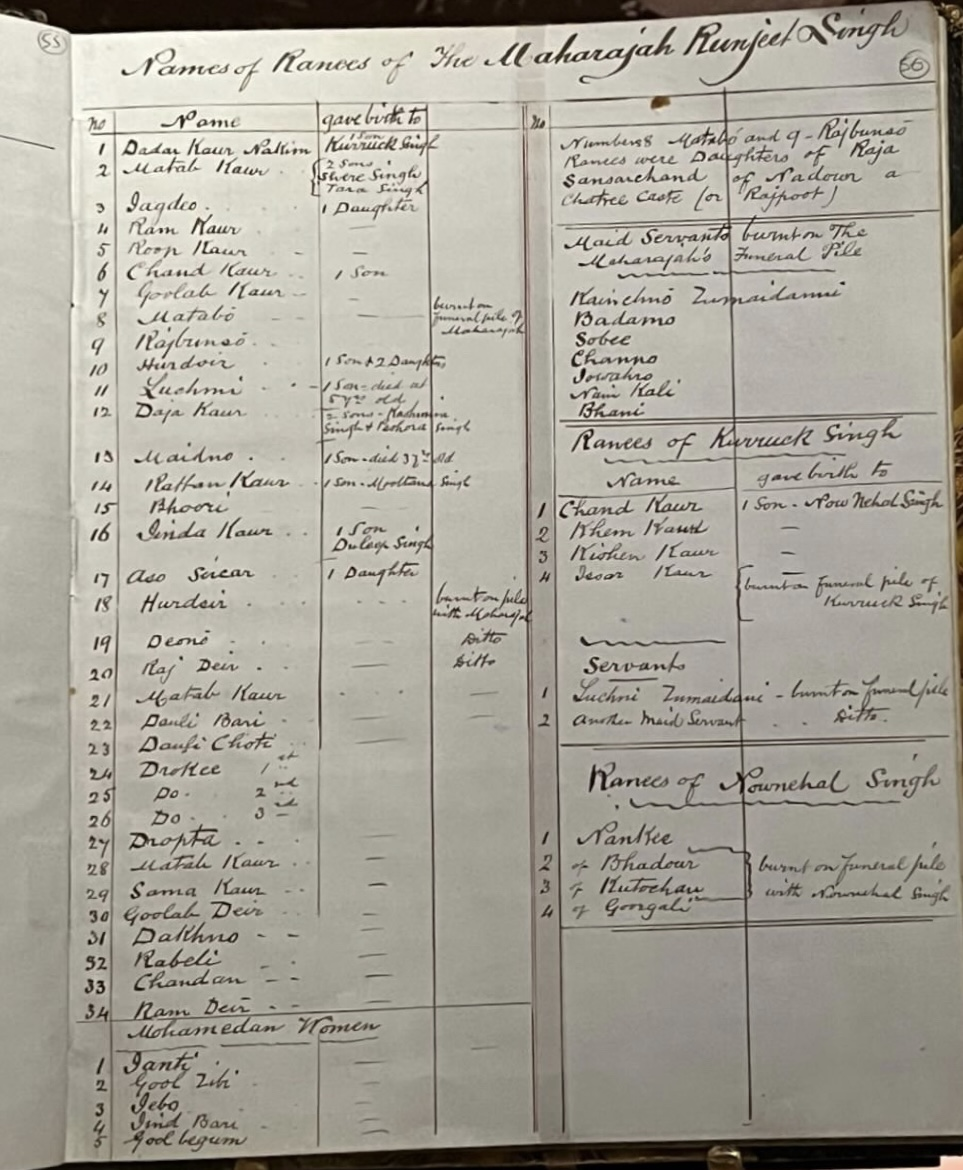

== List of notable wives ==
=== Mehtab Kaur ===
Main Article: Mehtab Kaur

Jean-Marie Lafont notes that Ranjit Singh's first wife, Mehtab Kaur, was the only wife to bear the title of 'Maharani'. Mehtab Kaur was betrothed to Ranjit Singh in 1786, married him in 1789, and was sent to live with him from 1796 after the muklawa (a ceremonial tradition in which the bride is sent to live with her husband's family) occurred. According to historian Sardar Singh Bhatia, Mehtab, however, largely lived with her mother, Sada Kaur, resenting Ranjit's father for having killed her own. Bhatia records that Mehtab had three sons: Ishar Singh (1804), Sher Singh (1807) and Tara Singh (1807). Mehtab died in 1813.

=== Raj Kaur ===
Main Article: Raj Kaur

Raj Kaur was the youngest child of Ran Singh Nakai of Nakai Misl. Estranged from Mehtab Kaur, Ranjit Singh married Raj Kaur in 1797. She was then renamed as Datar Kaur and was affectionately known as Mai Nakain.Bhatia notes that Raj Kaur was Ranjit Singh's 'favourite' wife and 'took active interest in the affairs of the State'. Sam Dalrymple states that she was the only woman that Ranjit Singh truly loved. Bhatia only makes notes of Raj Kaur's oldest son, Kharak Singh, who was born in 1801. Later descendants of Ranjit Singh have proved that Rattan Singh was also Raj Kaur's son. Raj Kaur died in 1838.

With regard to her death The Missionary reported,

"The Maharajah was never the same person again. He was no longer able to mount his horse himself and had to be lifted into the saddle. His recovery was retarded by the death of Mai Nakain, his favourite wife and companion of over forty years . He took the Nakain's death to heart and brooded over it a long time"

=== Ratan Kaur and Daya Kaur ===
Ratan Kaur and Daya Kaur were both wives of Sahib Singh Bhangi. When Sahib Singh Bhangi died, Ranjit Singh married the widows in 1811. Bhatia notes that the wedding was conducted via the chādar andāzī ceremony, a ceremony in which the marriage is effected upon the unfurling of a cloth on one's head. Daya Kaur had two children: Kashmira Singh and Pashaura Singh (1821). Ratan Kaur had one child, Multana Singh (1819). Both wives outlived Ranjit Singh.

=== Mahitab Devi and Raj Banso ===
Main Article: Rani Katochan

Mahitab Devi of Kangra, also known as Rani Guddan or Rani Katochan, married Ranjit Singh in 1829. Bhatia notes that Mahitab Devi had 'great influence' over Ranjit Singh and advocated for the arts by 'establishing a school hill music and dance' and introducing 'the art of Phulkari embroidery'. Mahitab Devi died in 1839, taking her husband's head in her lap and performing sati by immolating herself in his funeral pyre.

Raj Banso was Mahitab Devi's sister who also married Ranjit Singh in 1829. Bhatia notes that she was 'said to be the most beautiful of the Mahārāja's wives'. An advocate for the arts, like her sister, Raj Banso committed suicide in 1835 'over a typical palace trifle'. Bhatia writes that Ranjit Singh performed her cremation ceremony himself.

=== Jind Kaur ===
Main Article: Jind Kaur

Jind Kaur, wife of Ranjit Singh, is more notable as the mother of Duleep Singh (1838), the final ruler of the Sikh Empire. Jind Kaur married Ranjit Singh in 1835 after her father, Manna Singh Aulakh, who happened to be Ranjit Singh's 'royal kennel keeper', convinced him of her beauty. Jind Kaur outlived Ranjit Singh and was appointed regent when her son was eligible for the throne.

=== Moran Sarkar and subsequent punishment by the Akal Takht ===
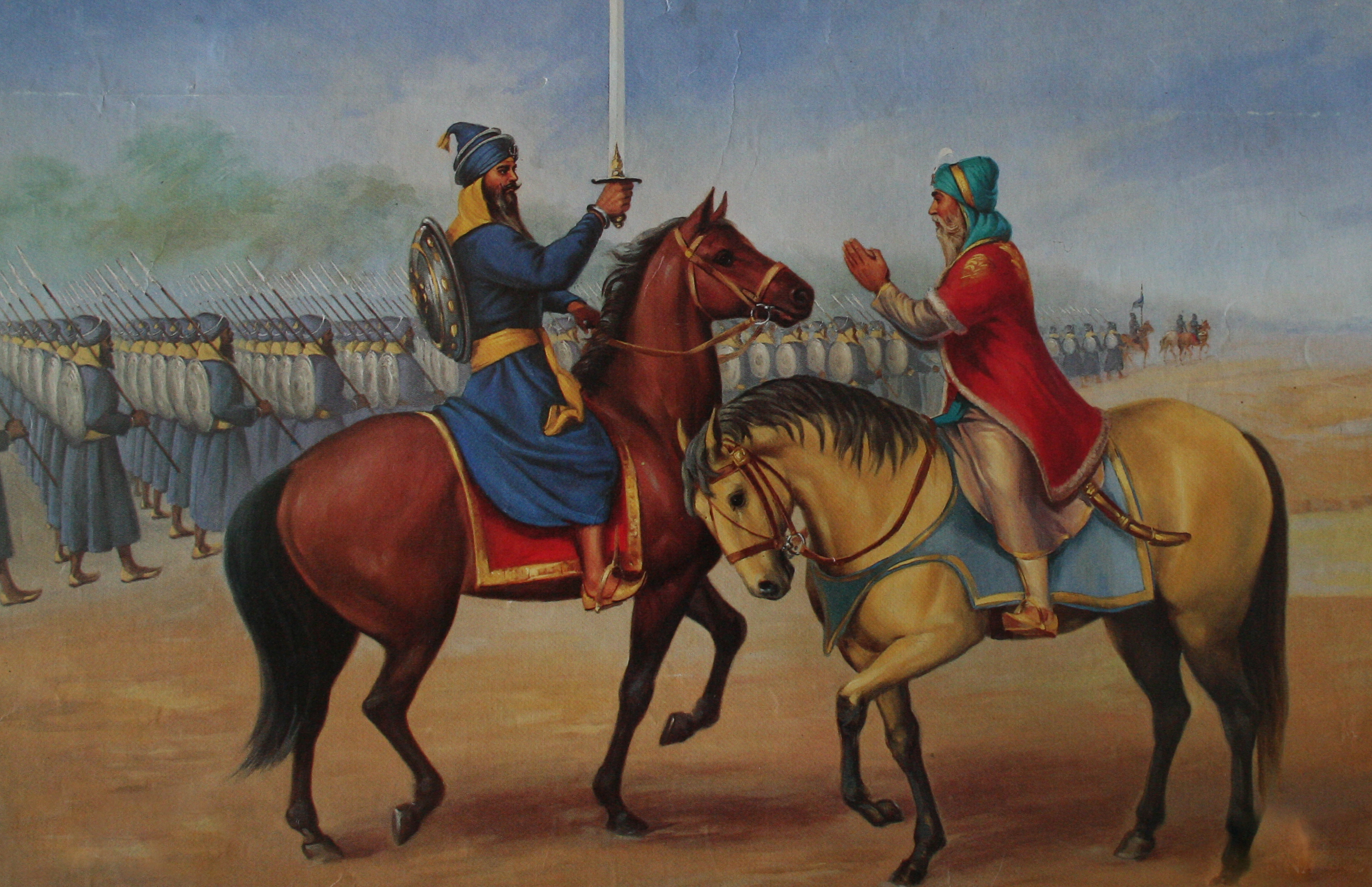
Akali Phula Singh addressing Maharaja Ranjit Singh about his transgressions

In 1802, Ranjit Singh married Moran Sarkar, a Muslim nautch girl. This action, and other non-Sikh activities of the Maharaja, upset orthodox Sikhs, including the Nihangs, whose leader Akali Phula Singh was the Jathedar of the Akal Takht. When Ranjit Singh visited Amritsar, he was called outside the Akal Takht, where he was made to apologise for his mistakes. Akali Phula Singh took Ranjit Singh to a tamarind tree in front of the Akal Takht and prepared to punish him by flogging him. Then Akali Phula Singh asked the nearby Sikh pilgrims whether they approved of Ranjit Singh's apology. The pilgrims responded with Sat Sri Akal and Ranjit Singh was released and forgiven. An alternative holds that Ranjit went to visit Moran on his arrival in Amritsar before paying his respects at Harmandir Sahib Gurdwara, which upset orthodox Sikhs and hence was punished by Akali Phula Singh.

== Other known wives ==
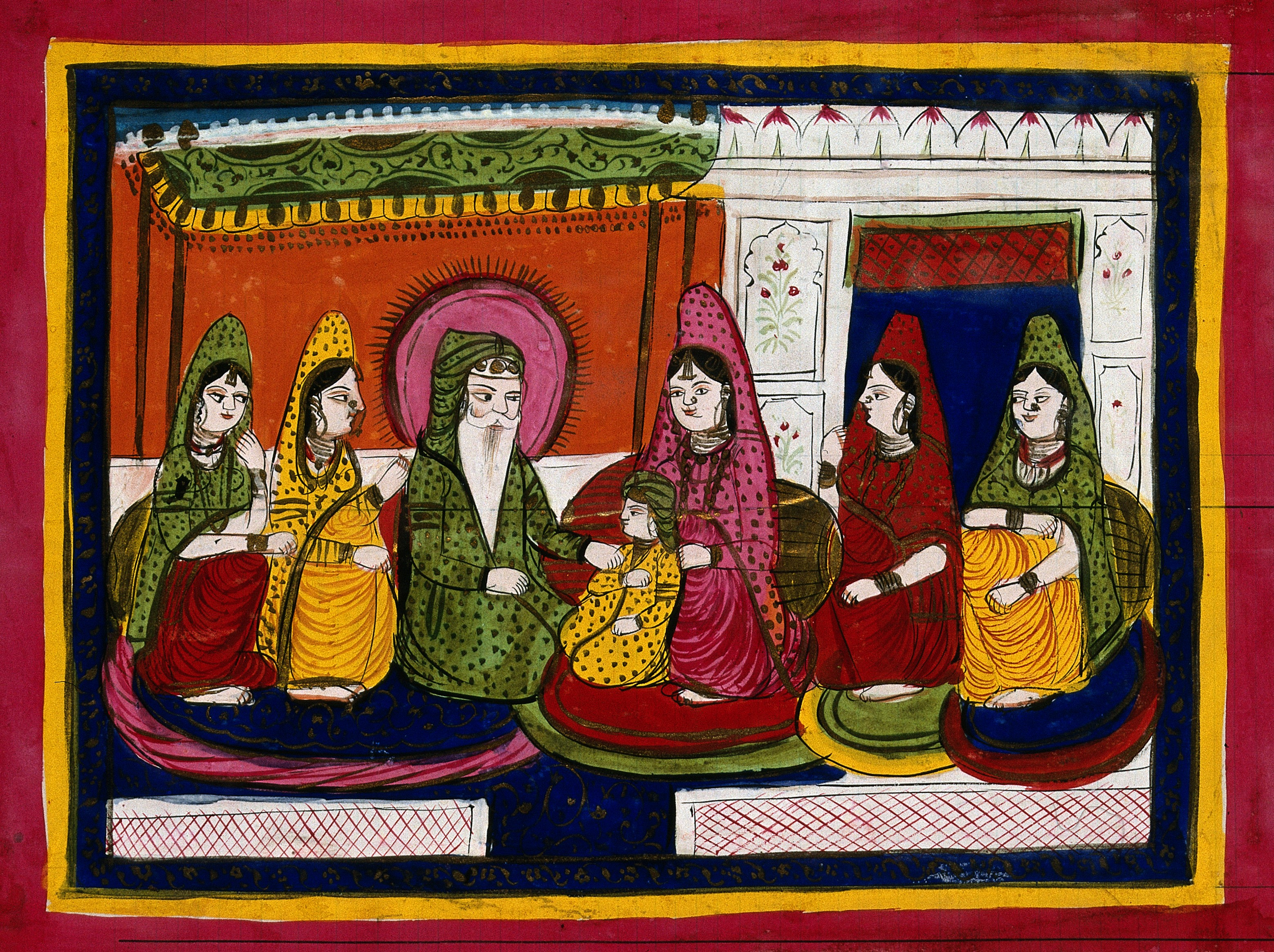
Maharaja Ranjit Singh with some of his wives.

Ranjit Singh married more women towards the end of his life. His other wives include Rani Har Devi of Atalgarh, Rani Aso Sircar and Rani Jag Deo. They had four daughters who could have been adopted. As the Sikh Empire expanded, Ranjit Singh married Pashtun women. In 1824 he married Jind Bani from Mankera and Gul Bano from Amritsar. In 1832 he married Zebo, a concubine from Kashmir.

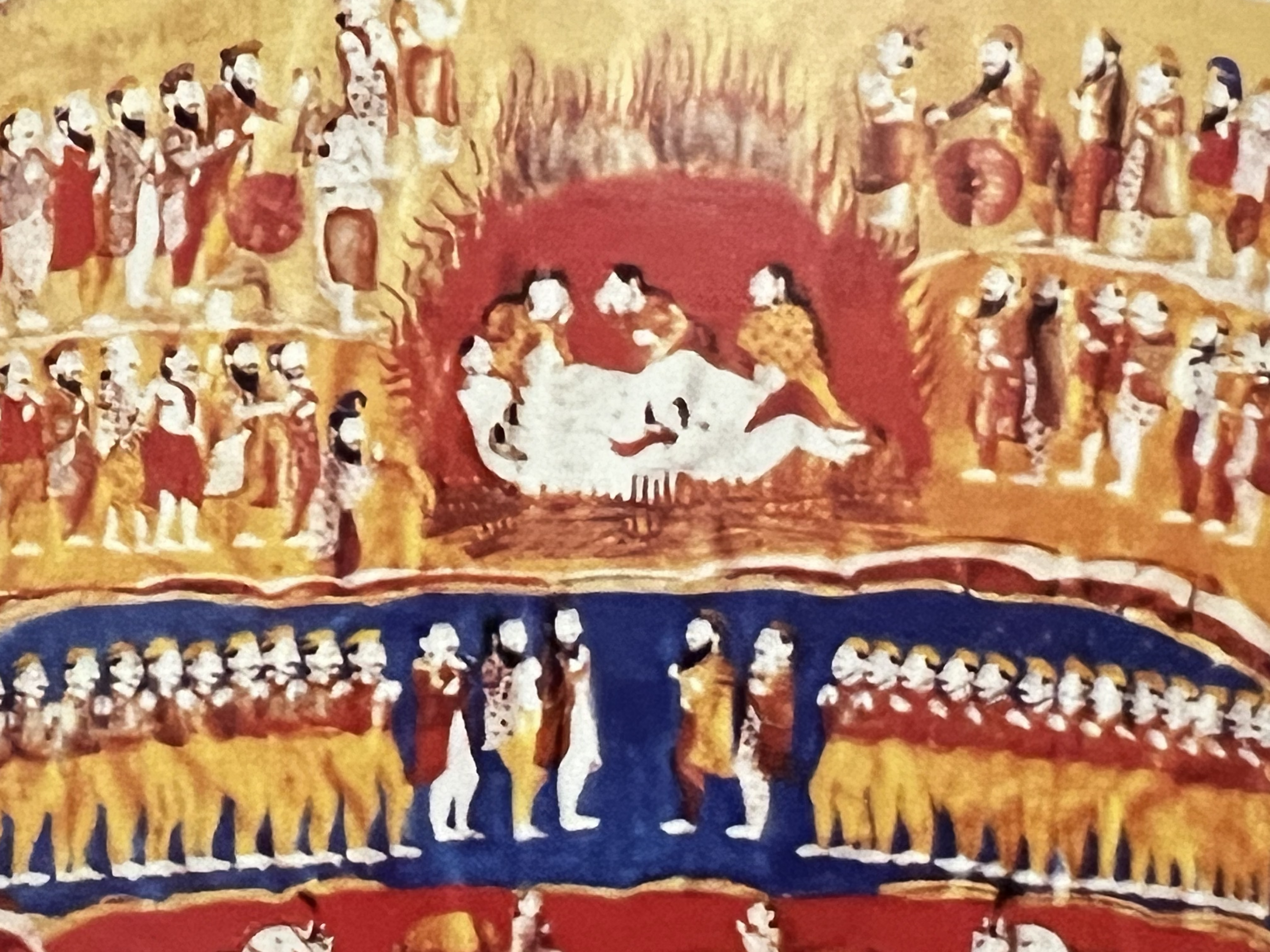
Seven women performing sati on the funeral pyre of Maharaja Ranjit Singh, three queens and four slave-girls as per Nadhra Shahbaz Naeem Khan, c. 1840

Ranjit Singh married many times, in various ceremonies, and according to some sources had twenty wives. Sir Lepel Griffin, however, provides a list of just sixteen wives and their pension list. Most of his marriages were performed through chādar andāz. Some scholars note that the information on Ranjit Singh's marriages is unclear, and there is evidence that he had many concubines. Priya Atwal presents an official list of Ranjit Singh's thirty wives. The women married through chādar andāzī were noted as concubines and were known as the lesser title of Rani (queen). While Mehtab Kaur and Datar Kaur officially bore the title of Maharani (high queen), Datar Kaur officially became the Maharani after the death of Mehtab Kaur in 1813. Throughout her life was referred to as Sarkar Rani. After her death, the title was held by Ranjit's youngest widow Jind Kaur. According to Khushwant Singh in an 1889 interview with the French journal Le Voltaire, his son Dalip (Duleep) Singh remarked, "I am the son of one of my father's forty-six wives." Atwal notes that Ranjit Singh and his heirs entered a total of 46 marriages. But Ranjit Singh was known not to be a "rash sensualist" and commanded unusual respect in the eyes of others. Faqir Sayyid Vaḥiduddin states: "If there was one thing in which Ranjit Singh failed to excel or even equal the average monarch of oriental history, it was the size of his harem." George Keene noted, "In hundreds and in thousands the orderly crowds stream on. Not a bough is broken off a wayside tree, not a rude remark to a woman".

== Titles ==
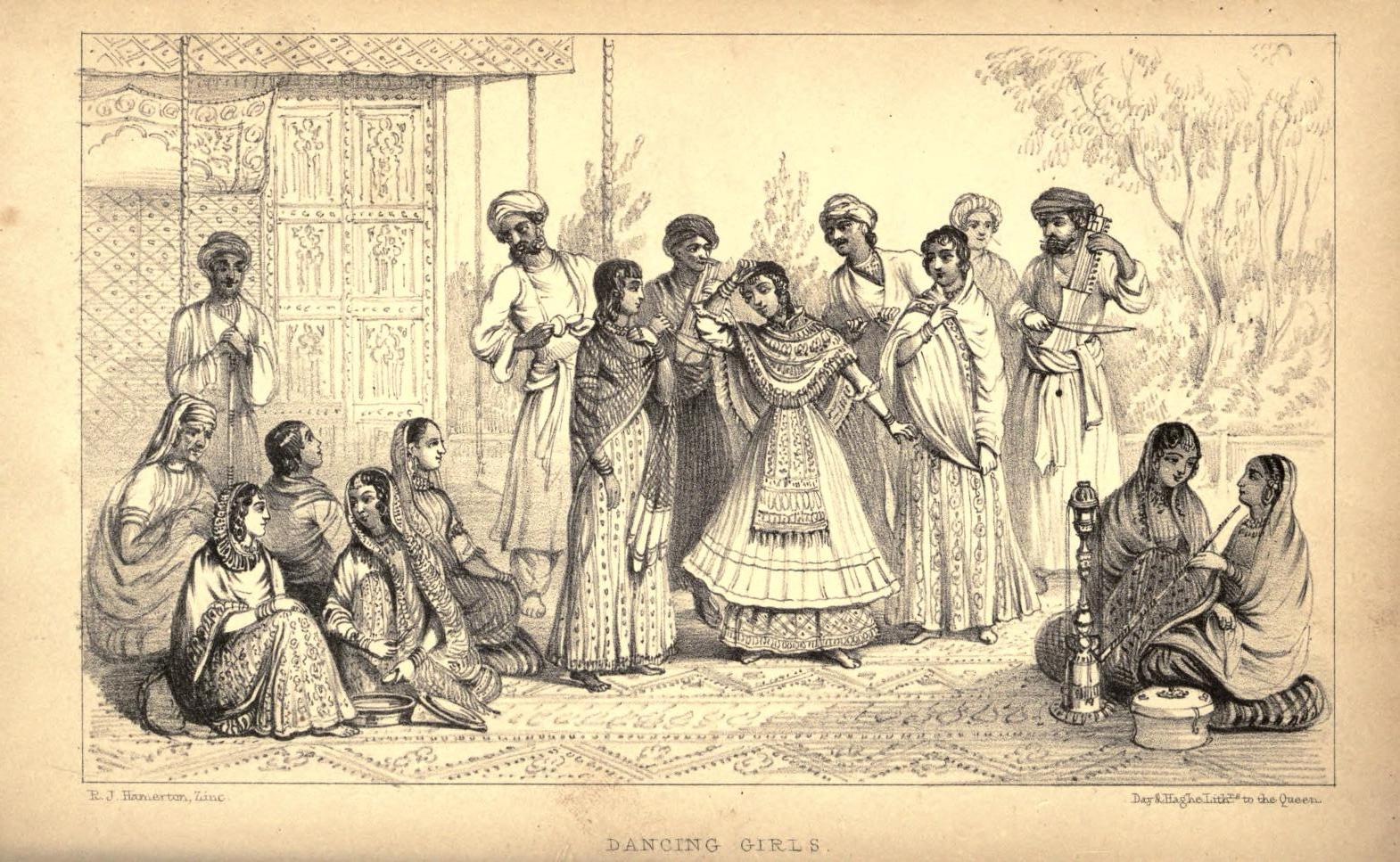
Lithograph titled 'Dancing Girls', from 'The Court and Camp of Runjeet Sing' by William Godolphin Osborne, depicting dancing-girls at the camp of Ranjit Singh, published in 1840

There were various khitab (titles) given to the women depending on their status. In the period of the Sikh Misls, high-status women, such as Sada Kaur and Raj Kaur, were given the title sardarni and the more-general term musammat. However, by the time of the 1830s when many new women were wed to Ranjit Singh, the wives were given the more prestigious title of sarkarat, a plural term referring to the multiple women who took-on the sarkar title after their marriage to Ranjit Singh. As per the writings of the court-historians, there were different terms used to differentiate between royal-women, such as wives, versus concubines and other women of the court (servants, dancers, courtesans, slaves, etc.), with royal-women being known through the titles of maharani, rani sahiba, sarkar, and were described as purdahnashin, for their practice of purdah. However, there were cases where non-royal women, such as dancing-girls, managed to elevate themselves to the position of being wives, such as the case of Gul Begum. Maharaja Ranjit Singh would go-on to bestow Gul Begum with the maharani title. The wives' families would often benefit from these marriages, with their brothers and other members of their family often being gifted jagirs and prestigious titles/positions. Most significant and powerful of Maharaja Ranjit Singh's wives was Maharani Datar Kaur who he affectionately called Mai Nakain. Though he went on to marry many women Mai Nakain remained his favorite and most respected wife.

== List ==
A list prepared by Priya Atwal of the known wives of Ranjit Singh, using contemporary documents and other sources, is as follows:

List of wives of Maharaja Ranjit Singh
No.	Name(s)	Portrait	Religion	Marriage date	Death date	Dependents, issues, or heirs
1.	Mehtab Kaur (1)		Sikh	1789	1813	Maharaja Sher Singh and Kunwar Tara Singh
2.	Mai Nakain (Datar Kaur)		Sikh	1797	1838	Maharaja Kharak Singh
3.	Moran (Mai Mohran)		Muslim	1802	1814	
4.	Rattan Kaur		Sikh	1811	?	Kunwar Multana Singh
5.	Daya Kaur		Sikh	1811	?	Kunwars Kashmira Singh and Pashaura Singh
6.	Unknown name			1812	?	
7.	Roop Kaur		Sikh	1815	?	Adopted her nephew’s son
8.	Jumrul Beebee			1816	?	
9.	Luchmee Kaur Vudpuggun		Sikh	1820	?	Took-care of Duleep Singh when Jind Kaur was exiled. Adopted a girl named Ram Kaur.
10.	Jind Kulan (Jind Bani)			1824	?	
11.	Jind Kaur		Sikh	1825?	1863	Maharajah Duleep Singh
12.	Doulee Khoond		Hindu	1826	?	
13.	Chund Kaur		Sikh	1827	?	
14.	Dukhno		Hindu	1827	?	
15.	Katochan (Mehtab Devi/Guddan)		Hindu	1829	1839 (death by sati)	
16.	Raj Banso		Hindu	1829	1830s, possibly 1835 (death by suicide through overdosing on opium after Ranjit Singh compared her beauty to that of a dancing-girl)	
17.	Medno			1829	?	
18.	Mehtab Kaur (2)		Sikh	1829	?	
19.	Zebo			1830	1855?	Possibly a son of a Kashmiri pundit named Buksheesh Singh, who was later adopted by Sher Singh when Zebo became his concubine
20.	Gul Begum		Muslim	1830	1863?	Adopted a Muslim boy
21.	Bhooree			1831	?	Adopted Bhoop Singh, the son of a slave-girl
22.	Deokee Khoord			1832	?	
23.	Suman Kaur			1832	?	
24.	Chainpurwala			?		
25.	Hardavi		Hindu	?	1839 (death by sati)	
26.	Deokee Kulan			?	1854	
27.	Doulee Kulan			?	1859	
28.	Durooptee			?	29 December 1852	
29.	Gulab Kaur			?	July 1856 (died at the age of 47)	
30.	Unknown 30th wife					
