= Mehtap =

Mehtap is a Turkish female given name of Persian origin meaning moonlight or full moon. It may refer to:

- Mehtap TV, television station in Turkey

== People with the given name ==
- Mehtap Demir (born 1978), Turkish singer
- Mehtap Doğan-Sızmaz (born 1978), Turkish female long-distance runner
- Mehtap Kurnaz (born 1995), Turkish women's weightlifter
- Mehtap Oezaslan, professor in electrochemistry

== See also ==
- Mahtab, a given name
- Mehta, an Indian surname
- Mehtab (disambiguation)
