= Grewal =

- Jat clan
- Ethnicity: Punjabis
- Religion: Sikhism, Hinduism and Islam

Grewal or Garewal is a family name historically used in India and Pakistan as a gotra (clan) of Jat people.

== Notable people ==
- Alexi Grewal, Olympic gold medalist and cyclist;
- Gippy Grewal, singer, actor, and producer;
- Gurbir Grewal, former Attorney General of New Jersey and current director of enforcement for the SEC;
- Gurcharan Singh Grewal, Olympic gold medalist and field hockey player;
- Gurmant Grewal, former 3-term Member of Parliament in Canada and Deputy House Leader;
- Hardeep Grewal, Ontario MPP
- Inderpal Grewal, professor of Women's, Gender and Sexuality Studies at Yale University;
- J. S. Grewal, Indian writer, historian, and scholar;
- Mehtab Singh Grewal, Home minister in the court of Maharaja Hira Singh of Nabha State.
- Nina Grewal, former 4-term Member of Parliament in Canada. Nina and Gurmant Grewal were the first married couple to concurrently serve in the Canadian Parliament;
- Raj Grewal, former Member of Parliament in Canada from 2015 to 2019
- Sarla Grewal, Indian bureaucrat
- Zareena Grewal, historical anthropologist and documentary filmmaker
