= Mehtab =

Mehtab is a unisex given name and surname of Persian origin. Notable people with the name include:

== Given name ==
- Mehtab (actress) (1913–1997), Indian actress
- Mehtab Abbasi (born 1953), Pakistani politician
- Mehtab Hossain (born 1985), Indian footballer and coach
- Mehtab Kadınefendi (1830–1888), wife Sultan Abdülmecid I
- Mehtab Kaur (1782–1813), Indian noblewoman
- Mehtab Kaur of Patiala (1922–2017), Indian noblewoman
- Mehtab Sangma (born 1985), Indian politician
- Mehtab Singh (disambiguation), multiple people

== Surname ==
- Nusrit Mehtab, English police officer

== See also ==
- Mehtab Bagh, charbagh complex in Agra, North India
- Mahtab, an alternative transliteration
