= Mehtab Singh =

Mehtab Singh may refer to:

== People ==
- Mehtab Singh (boxer) (1948–2021), Indian boxer
- Mehtab Singh (footballer) (born 1998), Indian footballer
- Mehtab Singh (politician) (1879–1938), Indian lawyer, freedom fighter, and legislator
- Mehtab Singh Bhangu (died 1745), Sikh warrior and martyr
- Mehtab Singh Grewal (1857–??), Indian politician
