= The Last Queen =

2021 book

- Author: Chitra Banerjee Divakaruni
- Language: English
- Genre: History
- Publisher: HarperCollins
- Publication date: 3 February 2021
- Publication place: India
- Pages: 372
- ISBN: 978-9-3903-5196-1

The Last Queen is a book based on the life of Maharani Jind Kaur, last queen of Punjab and one of the wives of Ranjit Singh. The novel is written by the India-born American novelist Chitra Banerjee Divakaruni, and is her tenth novel.

The novel is told from the perspective of Jind Kaur, and tells the story of how her political manoeuvering in the zenana, her stand against British colonialisation and her life in exile as a freedom fighter, and going to England to retrieve her son.

In an interview with the San Diego Union-Tribune, Divakaruni said she wrote the book because "We know about the father and the son, but she is largely absent in the historical accounts," and she wanted to fill in that gap.
