= Ishar Singh (Sikh prince) =

Sikh prince (1804–1805)

- Born: 31 January 1804; Batala, Punjab, Sikh Empire
- Died: 1805 (aged 0–1); Punjab, Sikh Empire
- House: Sukerchakia
- Father: Maharaja Ranjit Singh
- Mother: Maharani Mehtab Kaur

Kunwar Ishar Singh (31 January 1804 – 1805) was the son of Ranjit Singh, Maharaja of the Sikh Empire and his first wife Maharani Mehtab Kaur of the Kanhaiya Misl. Ishar Singh was the first son of Mehtab Kaur and the second son of Ranjit Singh, as his second wife Maharani Datar Kaur of the Nakai Misl gave birth to his first son and heir apparent in 1801.

The birth of Ishar Singh delighted Mehtab's mother Sada Kaur the most, she named him Ishar Singh. However, the prince died in infancy.
