= Mehtap Oezaslan =

German chemist

Mehtap Oezaslan is a full professor for technical electrocatalysis at TU Braunschweig.

== Education and professional life ==
Oezaslan studied Chemistry at TU Berlin and finished her diploma in the group of R. Schomäcker. From January 2008 to February 2012, she did her PhD in the group of P. Strasser at TU Berlin. From November 2012 to July 2014, she was a scientist at the Paul Scherrer Institute. In August 2014, she became a junior professor for Electrochemistry at Carl von Ossietzky University of Oldenburg. Since June 2019, she is a full professor at TU Braunschweig.

== Awards ==
She received several prizes in her career. She was awarded a Klaus-Koch Stipend in the years 2003, 2004 and 2005. She was awarded the Clara von Simons-Prize of the TU Berlin in 2007. She was in the Fast Track Program of the Robert Bosch Stiftung from 2012 to 2014. In 2014, she received the Umicore Scientific Award.

== Research ==
Her research covers full cells, water electrolysis, CO_{2} reduction, electrocatalysis.
