= Mehtab Kaur =

Sikh Maharani Sahiba (tenure: 1801-1813)

- Maharani Sahiba
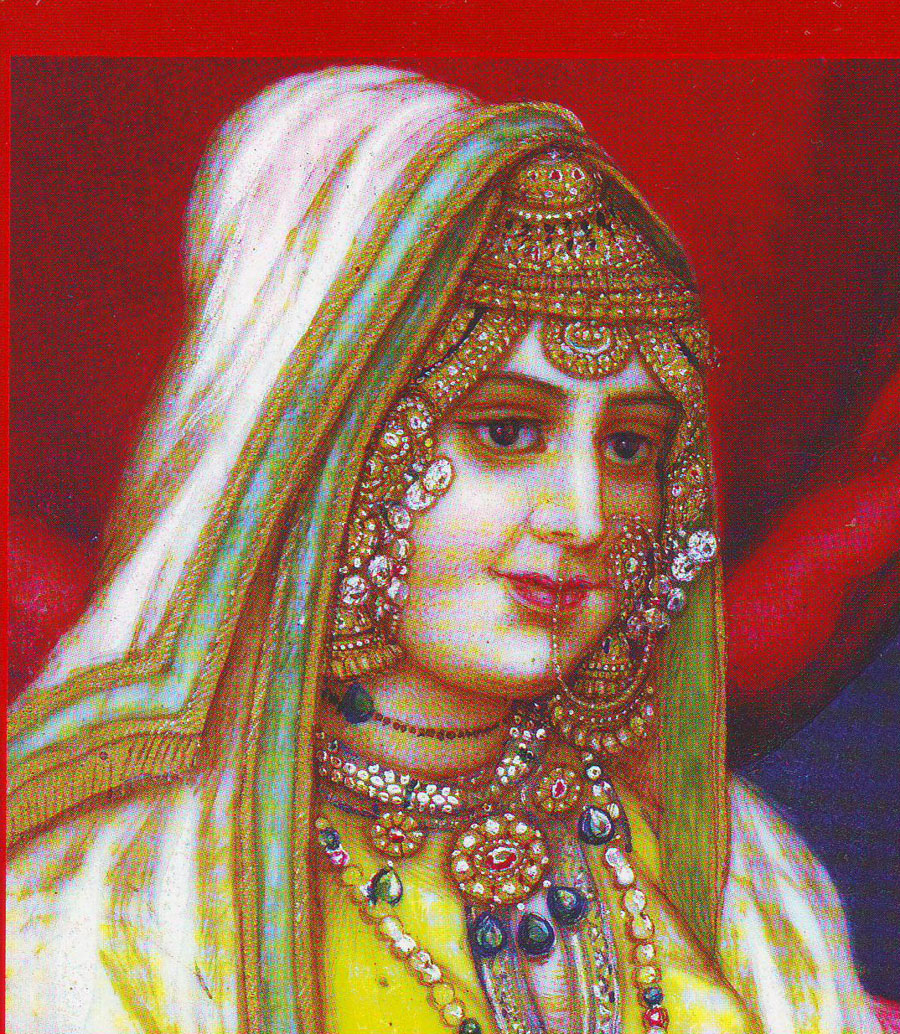
- Maharani Mehtab Kaur by Rattan Singh c.1810

Maharani consort of the Sikh Empire
- Tenure: c. 1801 – 1813

Sardarni of Sukerchakia Misl
- Tenure: April 1792 – 11 April 1801
- Predecessor: Raj Kaur
- Successor: Position abolished
- Born: 1782; Batala, Kanhaiya Misl, Sikh Confederacy (present-day Punjab, India
- Died: 1813 (aged 30–31); Amritsar, Sikh Empire (present-day Punjab, India)
- Spouse: Ranjit Singh (m. 1789; sep. 1797)
- Issue: Ishar Singh; Maharaja Sher Singh; Tara Singh
- House: Kanhaiya (by birth); Sukerchakia (by marriage)
- Father: Gurbaksh Singh Kanhaiya
- Mother: Sada Kaur
- Religion: Sikhism

Maharani Mehtab Kaur born Bibi Mehtab Kaur Kanhaiya (c. 1782 – 1813) was the first wife of Maharaja Ranjit Singh, the founder of the Sikh Empire. She was the mother of Maharaja Sher Singh, who briefly became the ruler of the Sikh Empire from 1841 until his death in 1843.

Mehtab Kaur was the only daughter of Sada Kaur and Gurbaksh Singh Kanhaiya. Her father was the first commander or sardar of Khalsa army to protect Punjab. She was betrothed to a six-year-old Ranjit Singh at the age of four.

According to historian Jean-Marie Lafont, she was the only one to bear the title of Maharani (Great Queen).

Though historian Jean-Marie Lafont, in his biography of Maharaja Ranjit Singh, wrote that Mehtab Kaur was the only one to bear the title of Maharani, contemporary court chronicles refer to Datar Kaur as the Maharani and principal consort of Ranjit Singh. The court chronicle of Ranjit Singh, Umdat-ut-Tawarikh refers to Datar Kaur as his queen consort.

== Family ==
Mehtab Kaur, the only child of Gurbaksh Singh Kanhaiya (Sandhu) and his wife Sada Kaur Dhaliwal, was born in 1782. Upon her birth she was named "Mehtab" (مهتاب) which means 'moonlight' or 'splendor of the moon' in Persian due to her fair complexion. Her father, Gurbaksh Singh, was the heir of Jai Singh Kanhaiya (a Sandhu Jat), the founder and chief of the Kanhaiya Misl.

The Kanhaiya Misl, who had replaced the Bhangis as the most powerful misl, disputed the right of Ranjit Singh's father's (Maha Singh) to plunder Jammu, and in one of the many skirmishes between the two misls, Gurbaksh Singh was killed in battle against Maha Singh in February 1785.

Mehtab Kaur's mother, Rani Sada Kaur, an intelligent, high spirited and ambitious woman, used to lend support of the Kanhaiya misl to Ranjit Singh till 1821, when she developed differences with him and as a consequence lost her territory to him.

== Marriage ==
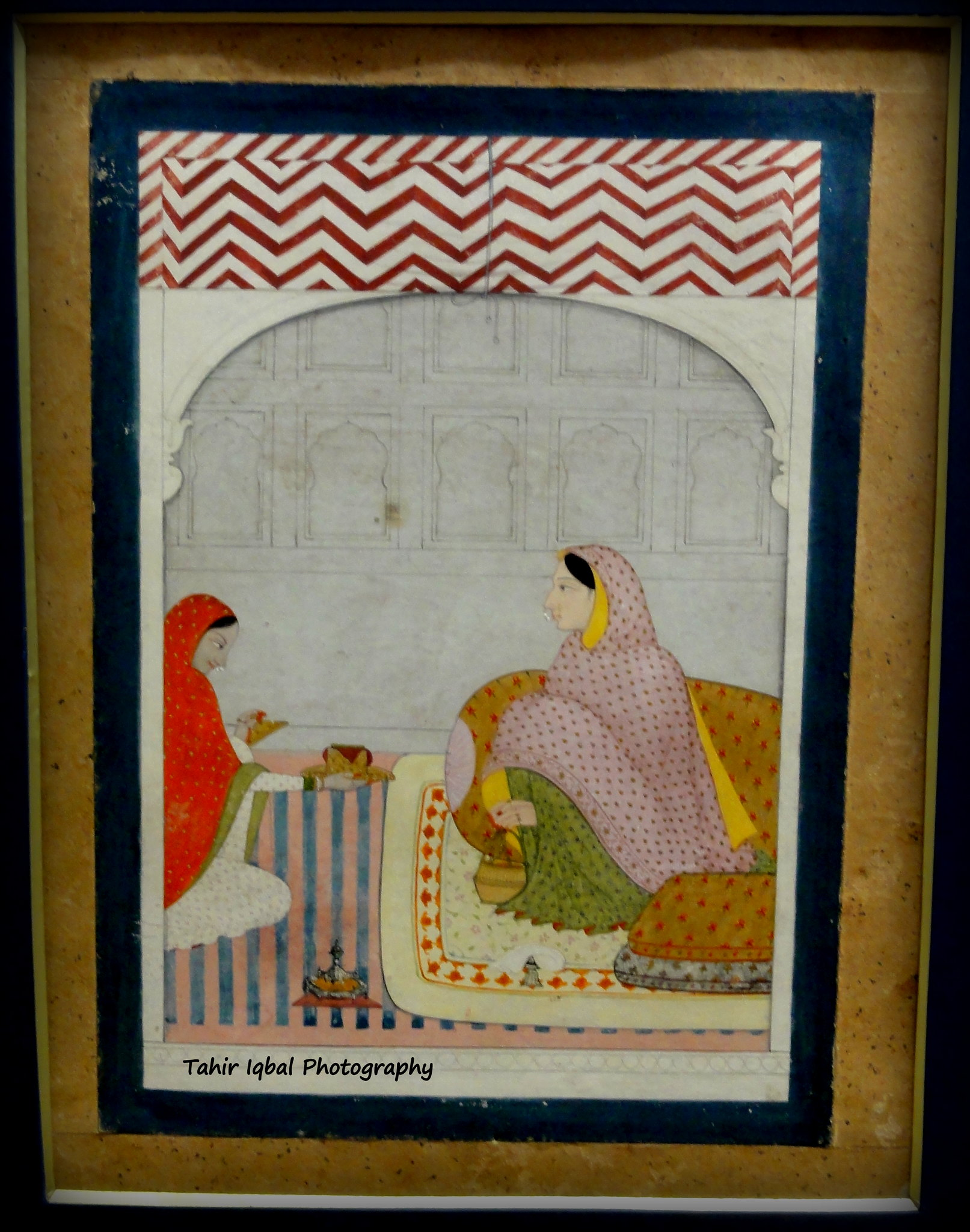
Painting of Maharani Mehtab Kaur of the Sikh Empire with an attendant

Jai Singh disagreed to betroth his granddaughter, Mehtab Kaur, to Maha Singh's son, Ranjit Singh, but was persuaded by his widowed daughter-in-law, Sada Kaur to agree to the match. The Kanhaiya chief died shortly afterwards in 1789, leaving his estates to Sada Kaur who took over the leadership of the Kanhaiya Misl. The same year the young Mehtab Kaur and Ranjit Singh were betrothed and married. The Muklawa happened in 1796.

As a teenager, Ranjit Singh took hardly any interest in the affairs of the state, making his mother, Raj Kaur, anxious for his future. She felt that marriage might bring him around to the responsibilities of life. She approached Sada Kaur to fix the muklawa (tradition where the wife goes back to her maternal home) date. Ranjit was fifteen years old when he left Gujranwala for Batala, the chief town of the Kanhaiyas, to perform the after marriage rituals with Mehtab Kaur in 1796. This alliance between the two important Sikh families was a major event for Punjab. All the leading Sikh chiefs were present at the wedding. Mehtab Kaur was very beautiful and her looks made her seem mismatched for the rugged Ranjit Singh. Even if Mehtab Kaur could reconcile herself to her husband's looks, it must have been difficult for her to forget that her father was killed in battle with Ranjit Singh's father. Plus she was haughty and self-willed, a proud woman born to rich parents while Ranjit Singh to her was wayward and rustic in his habits. It was a marriage of convenience for both and they rarely stayed together.

After entering into a matrimonial alliance with the Kanhaiya Misl, Ranjit Singh wanted to consolidate his position further which could only be done by drawing some other misl to his side. He made suggestions to head of the Nakais and early in 1797 took a second wife, who was the sister of the Nakai Sardar Gyan Singh Sandhu- with whom he was betrothed for some time. The second marriage not only provided Ranjit Singh more political power but a more successful marriage as Datar Kaur become Ranjit Singh's most favorite wife and mother of his heir, Kharak Singh.

=== Issue ===
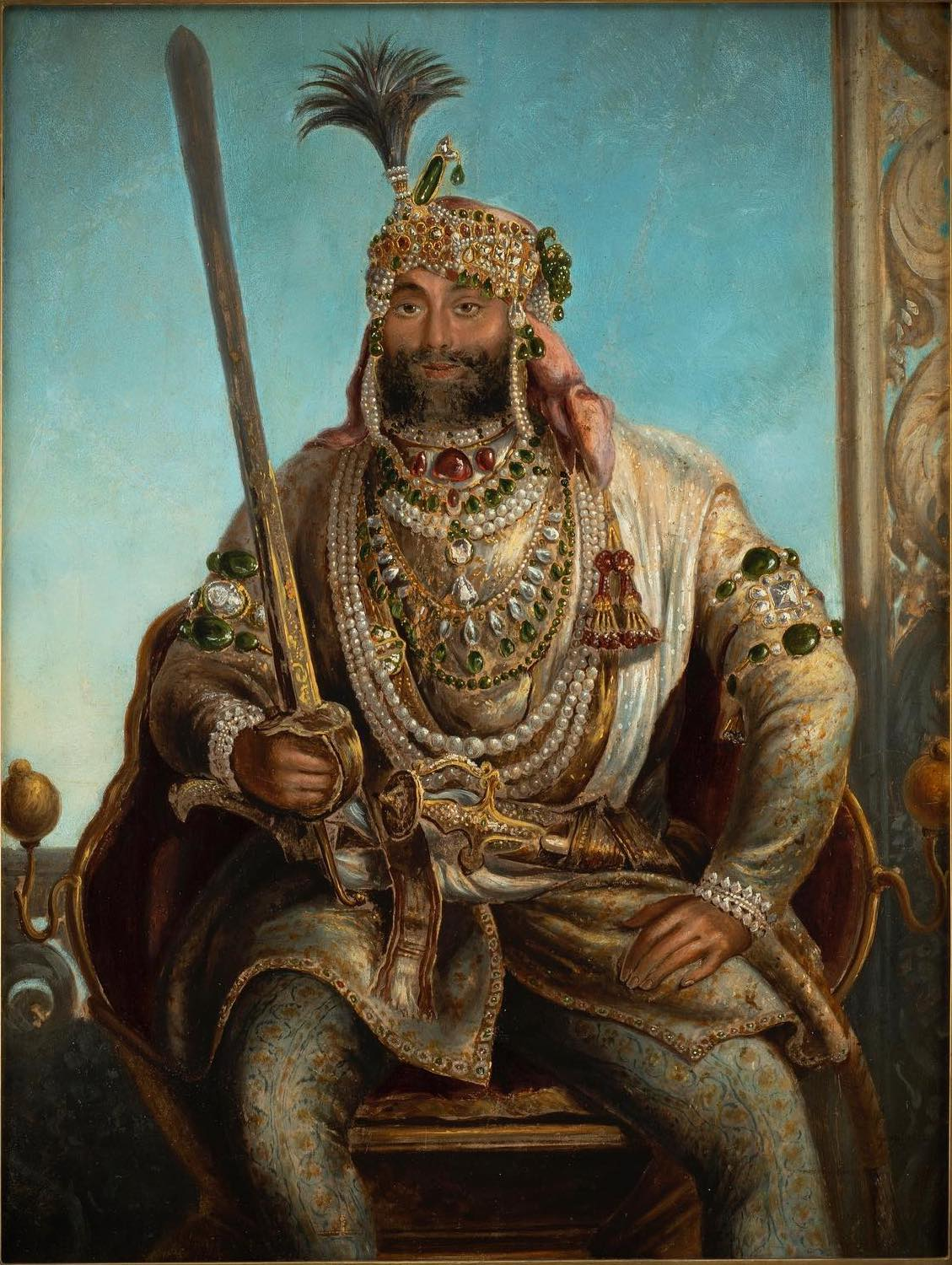
Maharaja Sher Singh (r. 1841 - 1843)

Sada Kaur kept on trying to bring Ranjit Singh closer to her daughter and felt happy when Mehtab bore Ranjit his son (and their first child) in 1804. Thanking God (Ishwar) the child was named Ishar Singh. The prince died in infancy - at the age of one and a half years. Mehtab Kaur was pregnant again in 1807 and gave birth to twin boys, Sher Singh and Tara Singh in Batala. Ranjit was near Jawalamukhi when he received the news of their birth, he rushed to Amritsar to pay a thanksgiving visit to the Golden Temple there. The birth of his sons was celebrated greatly. There was cheering in the illustrious camp and when Ranjit returned to Lahore, he gave away vast entire-ties in philanthropy and the city was enlightened for a few nights.

== Death ==
After suffering from a failing health for a long time, Maharani Mehtab Kaur died in 1813. At the time of her death, Maharaja Ranjit Singh was at Amritsar, he did not attend her cremation and only after Dewan Mokham Chand's persuasion he attended other condolatory ceremonies.

== In popular culture ==
- Mehtab Kaur is portrayed in the TV series Maharaja Ranjit Singh.
- A teenage Mehtab Kaur is portrayed by Tunisha Sharma in Life OK's historical drama Sher-e-Punjab: Maharaja Ranjit Singh.

== See also ==
- Sher Singh
- Kanhaiya Misl

== Bibliography ==
- Singh, Khushwant (2008). Ranjit Singh. Penguin Books India. ISBN 978-0143065432.
- Lafont, Jean-Marie (2002). Maharaja Ranjit Singh : Lord of the five rivers (2. impression ed.). New Delhi: Oxford University Press. ISBN 978-0-19-566111-8.
