= Tara Singh (Sikh prince) =

Sikh prince

- Born: 4 December 1807; Batala, Sikh Empire, now Gurdaspur district, Punjab, India
- Died: 1859 (aged 51–52); Dasuya, Hoshiarpur
- Spouse: Dharam Kaur Randhawa
- House: Sukerchakia
- Father: Maharaja Ranjit Singh
- Mother: Maharani Mehtab Kaur Kanhaiyā

Kunwar Tara Singh (4 December 1807 – 1859), sometimes styled as Shahzada, was the younger of the twin sons of Maharaja Ranjit Singh, founder of Sikh Empire and his first wife Maharani Mehtab Kaur. His elder twin brother was Maharaja Sher Singh, who briefly became the ruler of the Sikh Empire from 1841 until his death in 1843. British sources imply he was impotent and an "imbecile".

He died in 1859, after the Sikh war. Some British pension sources state he died in 1861.

== Wives ==
According to British pension records, Tara Singh had at-least two wives named Dhurm Kaur Rundhavee (married 1823) and Chund Kaur. However, these women reportedly joined the zenana of Sher Singh after he became the maharaja.
