= Nusrit Mehtab =

Former English police officer

Nusrit Mehtab is a British former police officer, at one point the most senior Asian woman officer in the Metropolitan Police.

Nusrit Mehtab joined the Metropolitan Police in the late 1980s. Her work in trying to improve community relations in East London was the subject of a 1990s ITV documentary, Mehtab of the Met. She worked in undercover operations and counter-terrorism, rising through the ranks to become Superintendent. She is of Pakistani descent.

In January 2020, after 32 years, Mehtab left the police force. She complained of a "toxic workplace", and has subsequently brought a claim for constructive dismissal against the Met. She claims to have faced race, sex and religious discrimination, harassment and victimization there.

Mehtab is the author of the book Off The Beat: My life as a brown, Muslim woman in the Met, published in June 2024 (Torva/Penguin Books, ISBN 9781911709459.
