= Zareena Grewal =

Historical anthropologist and documentary filmmaker

- Awards: Victor Turner Prize

Academic work
- Discipline: American studies, anthropology, religious studies
- Institutions: Yale University

Zareena A. Grewal is a Pakistani-American historical anthropologist and documentary filmmaker whose work focuses on Islam in the United States. She is an associate professor of American studies, religious studies, and ethnicity, race, and migration at Yale University.

== Career ==
Grewal was a Fulbright Fellow in Egypt in 2002-03. In 2004, she directed and produced her debut film, By the Dawn’s Early Light: Chris Jackson’s Journey to Islam. The documentary examines Islamophobia in the United States through the lens of Mahmoud Abdul-Rauf (born Chris Jackson), a National Basketball Association (NBA) player who converted to Islam in the 1990s. Grewal's first book, Islam is a Foreign Country: American Muslims and the Global Crisis of Authority, was published by New York University Press in 2013. The book, an ethnography of Muslims in the United States and their connections to the global Islamic community, won third place in the 2014 Victor Turner Prize for Ethnographic Writing.

In October 2023, Grewal gained national attention after she expressed support on Twitter for the 2023 Hamas-led attack on Israel, saying that Palestinians had "every right to resist through armed struggle". She also wrote that those killed were not civilians because they are Israeli, tweeting, "Settlers are not civilians," in response to a Sky News journalist’s tweet insisting, "Civilians are civilians are civilians, doesn’t matter where," after the attack. A petition created by a Yale student to remove Grewal from her faculty position garnered more than 55,000 signatures. In response, a Yale spokesperson said that the university was "committed to freedom of expression". Grewal claimed that her posts had been "wildly taken out of context" and denied being a Hamas supporter. Grewal's tweets were later argued as an example of antisemitism on campus in an open letter signed by 1,400 Yale alumni, faculty, and parents.
