= Rani Katochan =

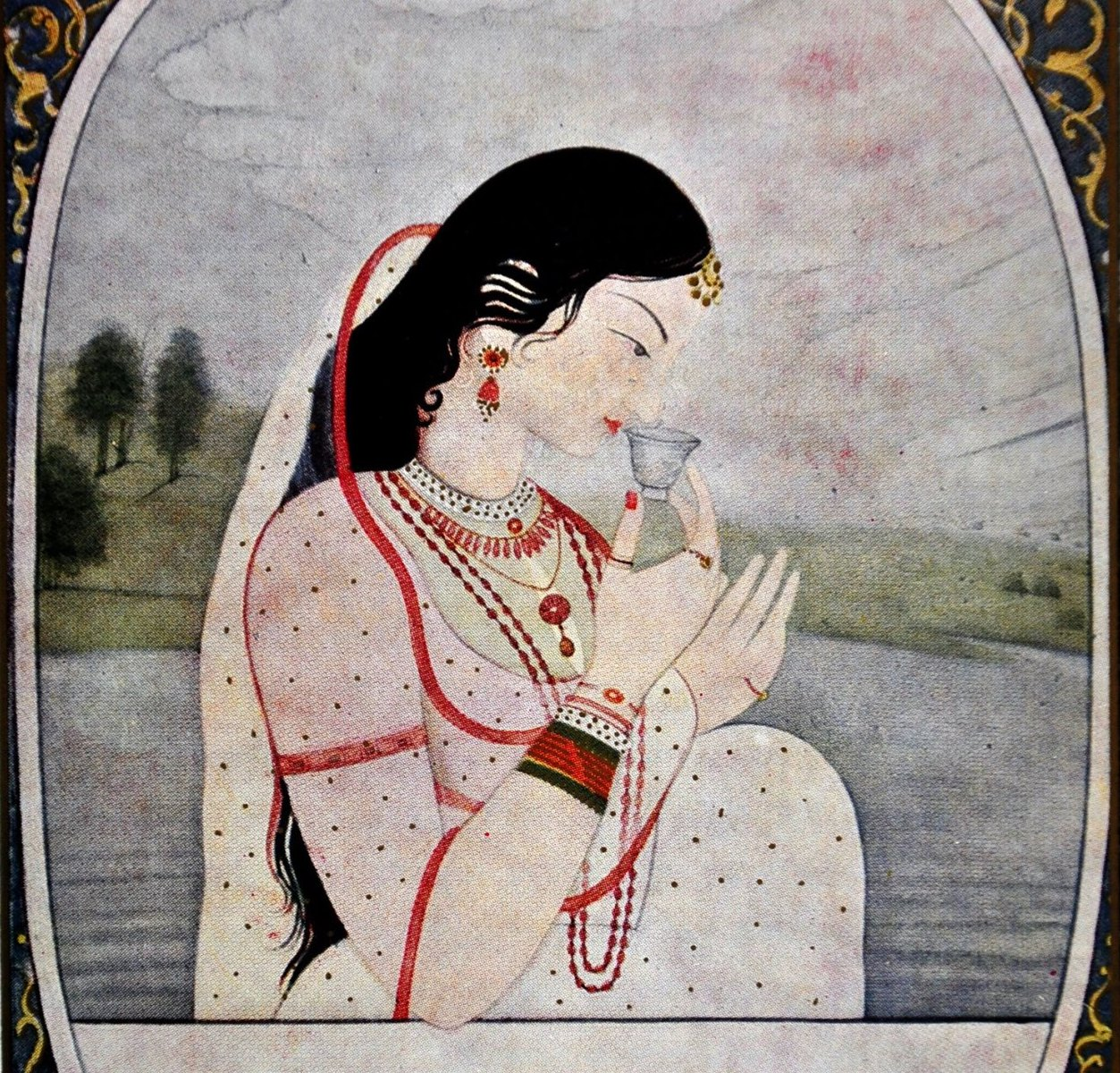
Portrait of Rani Gaddan, circa 19th century, Fakir Khana Museum, Lahore.

Rani Katochan (died 1839), also known as Guddan or Mahitab Devi, was a Pahari wife of Maharaja Ranjit Singh. She was the daughter of Raja Sansar Chand of Kangra. Her sister, Raj Banso, was also married to Ranjit Singh but killed-herself after Ranjit Singh compared her beauty to that of a dancing-girl, which the Rajput queen took as a great-offence.

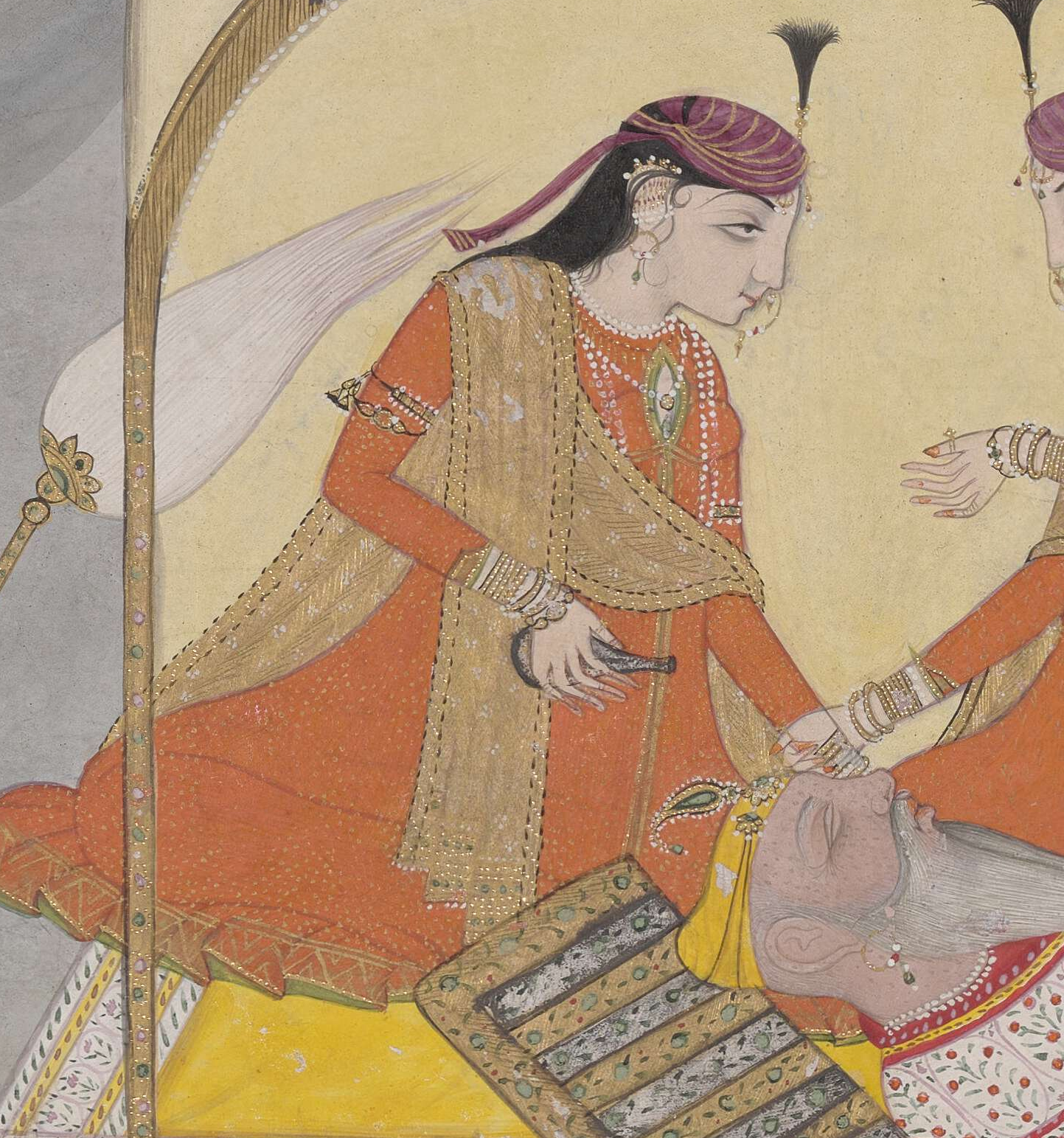
Rani Katochan with Ranjit Singh's head laying on her lap, detail from a painting of the funeral of Maharaja Ranjit Singh, ca.1840

Rani Katochan was said to have been personally devoted to her husband, so much so that she burnt herself on his funeral pyre in 1839. After Ranjit Singh's death, Dhian Singh visited Rani Katochan with the new Maharaja Kharak Singh. During this visit, Dhian Singh stated he wished to also burn himself on the funeral pyre of Ranjit Singh, which Rani Katochan saw as a manipulation tactic against Kharak Singh to extract political concessions, who then panicked and placed his head on Dhian Singh's feet and attempted to persuade him against this. In-response, Rani Katochan chastised Dhian Singh for his comments and that they were both disrespectful to the women preparing to commit sati and unfaithful to the maharaja. Then, she made Dhian Singh swear an oath on the Bhagavad Gita to be loyal to the new maharaja, Kharak Singh, and the younger prince, either Nau Nihal Singh or perhaps Sher Singh. Rani Katochan wanted to uphold the "sanctity of certain royal and religious rituals".

Rani Katochan was the principal mourner at the funeral of Ranjit Singh and emerged from the palace into the large courtyard for the first time in her life unveiled and barefoot, proceeding slowly toward the corpse. According to Sohan Lal Suri's account of Ranjit Singh's funeral, she placed the head of Ranjit Singh in her lap as the pyre burnt them whilst the other three queens and seven concubines performing sati sat in a circle around them. When news of Rani Katochan's sati reached her family back in Kangra, they were very pleased and decided to commission a painting in 1840 depicting the event.

Nau Nihal Singh also had a wife named Katochan, but this was a different woman who was the daughter of Rai Singh, the illegitimate son of Mian Fateh Singh of Lambagraon.
