= Mahtab =

Mahtāb (Persian: مهتاب, "moonlight", "the fullmoon", splendor of the "moon") is a given name derived from Persian. Notable people with the name include:

== Females ==
- Mahtab Farid (born 1985), American journalist
- Mahtab Keramati (born 1970), Iranian actress
- Mahtab Parsamehr (born 1989), Iranian archer
- Mahtob Mahmoody (born 1979), American author
- Mahtab Norouzi (c. 1934–2012), Iranian Baluchi master artisan in needlework

== Males ==
- Mahtabuddin Sarker (1903–1973), Bangladeshi politician and magistrate
- Mahtab Uddin Ahmad, member of the Pakistan National Assembly
- Shah Mahatab Ahmad, Bangladeshi politician
- Mamun Al Mahtab (born 1970), Bangladeshi doctor, hepatologist, medical scientist, and author
- Mahtab Hussain (born 1981), British-Pakistani fine art portrait photographer

== See also ==
- Mehtab, an alternative transliteration
