= Mehtab Singh Grewal =

Sardar Mehtab Singh Grewal (born 1857) was a home minister in the court of Maharaja Hira Singh of Nabha State in the early 20th century. Mehtab is credited with introducing the Mandi system in Punjab.
