= Catherine Duleep Singh =

English suffragette (1871 - 1942)

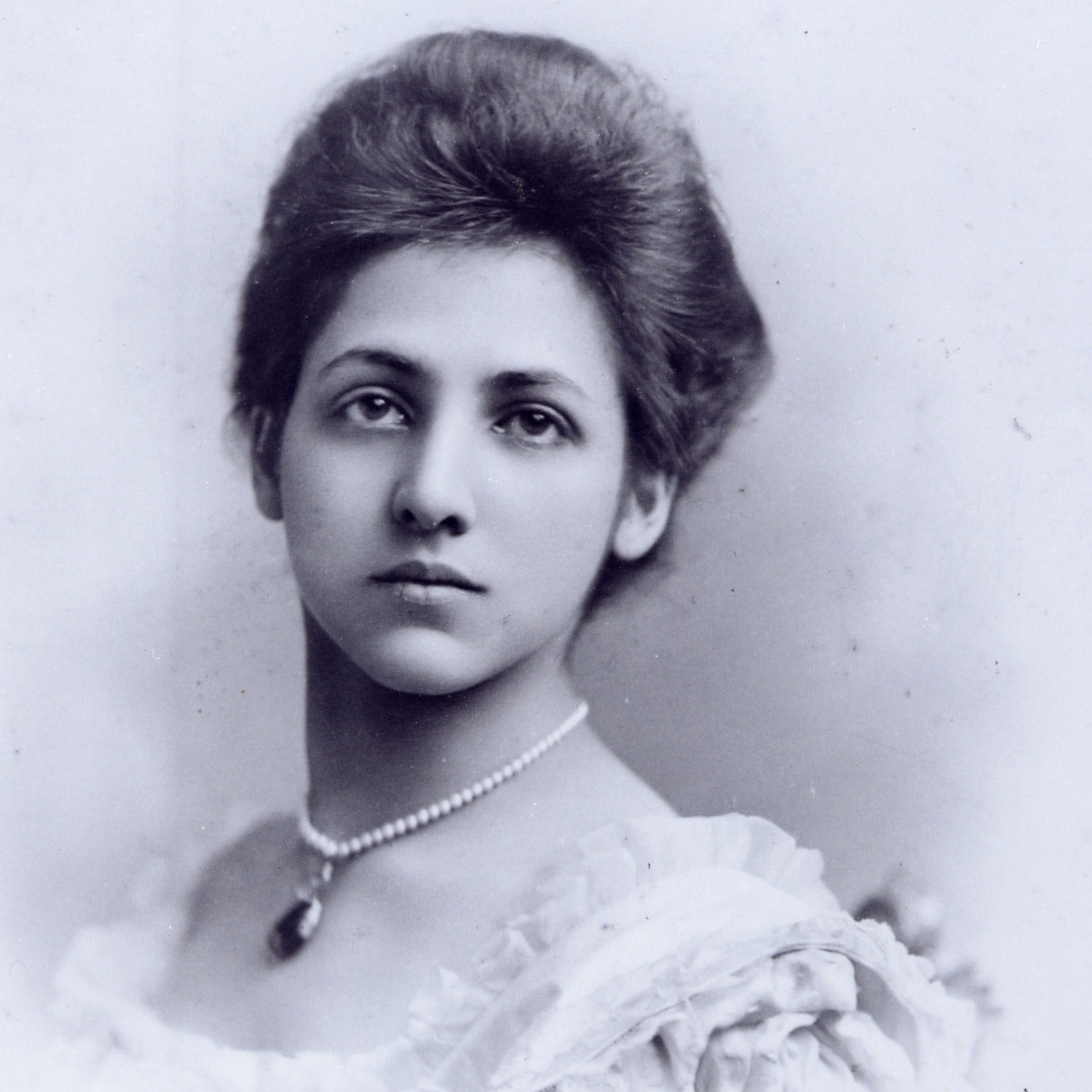
- Portrait of Princess Catherine Duleep Singh, by Lafayette Studio, 1897
- Born: Catherine Hilda Duleep Singh; 27 October 1871; Elveden Hall, Elveden, Suffolk, England
- Died: 8 November 1942 (aged 71); Penn, Buckinghamshire
- Father: Duleep Singh
- Mother: Bamba Müller

Princess Catherine Hilda Duleep Singh (27 October 1871 – 8 November 1942) was the second daughter of Maharaja Sir Duleep Singh and his first wife Maharani Bamba (née Müller) and the granddaughter of Maharaja Ranjit Singh of the Sikh Empire. She was educated in England and in 1894 she was presented at Court. She became a suffragist with her sisters, but did not take part in Emmeline Pankhurst’s Suffragette movement though her sister Sophia did.

She was a lifelong companion of governess Lina Schäfer and from 1904 lived with her in Germany until the latter's death in 1937. She requested her burial at Lina's side in her will. Catherine and Lina were instrumental in aiding many Jewish families escape from Germany during the 1930s.

In June 1997, her name was in the news upon the discovery of a dormant joint (with Schäfer) bank account in a Swiss bank. After several claimants had been rejected, the contents of the bank account were awarded by a Swiss tribunal to the family of a secretary of her elder sister Bamba in Pakistan.

== Biography ==
Singh was born on 27 October 1871 at Elveden Hall, Suffolk, in England. She was the second daughter of Maharaja Duleep Singh and Bamba Müller. She had an elder sister Bamba Sofia Jindan (1869–1957), a younger sister Sophia Alexandra (1876–1948), three brothers – Victor Albert Jay (1866–1918), Frederick Victor (1868–1926), and Albert Edward Alexander (1879–1942), and two half-sisters – Pauline Alexandra (1887–1941) and Ada Irene Beryl (1889–1926) by Duleep Singh's second marriage, to Ada Douglas Wetherill. Sophia was the best known of the sisters as she was an active suffragette.

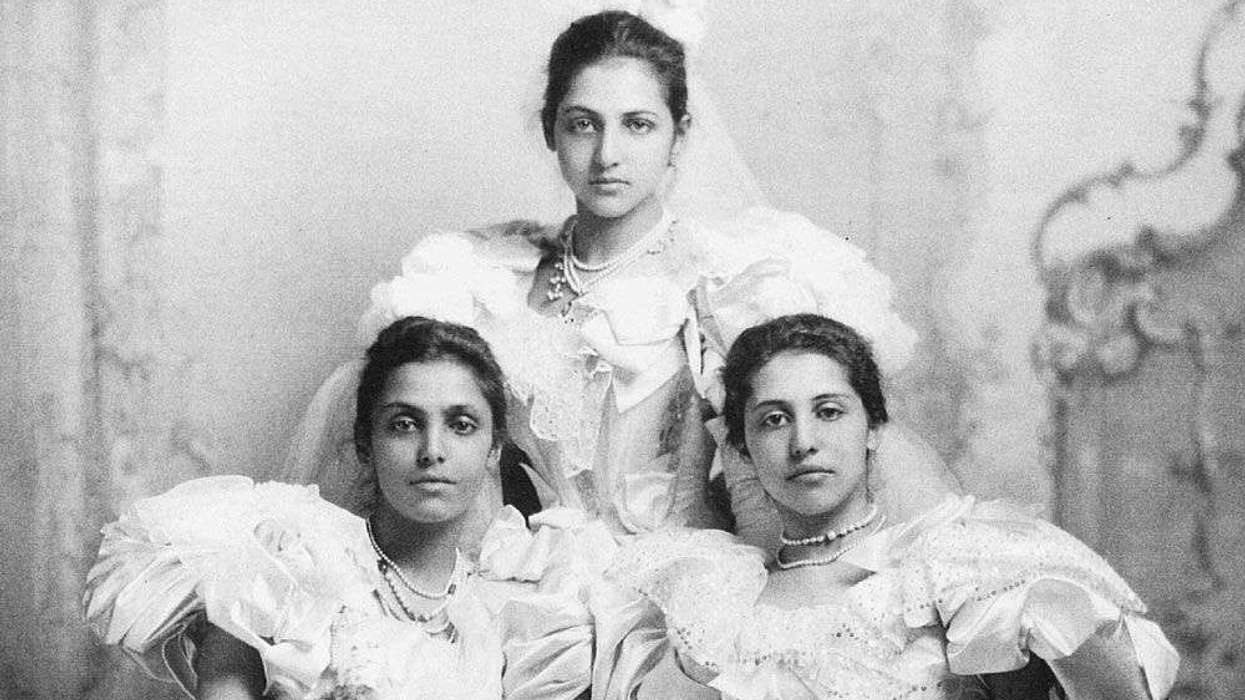
Catherine in centre with Bamba on the left and Sophia on the right

In 1886 her father attempted to move to India with his daughters but was prevented from entering India and forced to return from Aden. Catherine and her sisters then stayed at Folkestone, at 21 Clifton Street. Initially, Queen Victoria had desired to put them under the care of Lady Login but on the advice of the India Office in London their care was entrusted to Arthur Oliphant and his wife; Oliphant's father had worked as an equerry. It was during this period that the princess was introduced to Fräulein Lina Schäfer, a German teacher and governess from Kassel who was twelve years her senior. The Princess then developed a deep and intimate bond with Schäfer that lasted until the latter's death. Some scholars surmise that Singh and Schäfer were a lesbian couple.

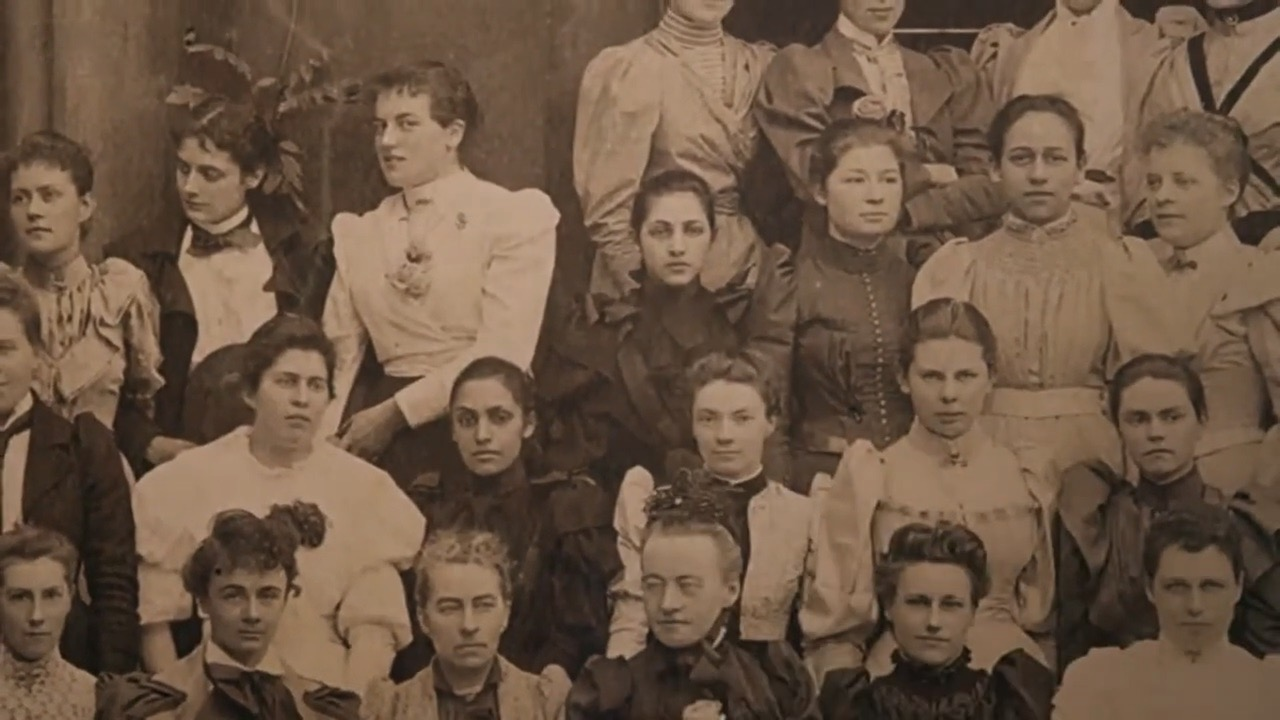
Photograph of Princess Catherine Duleep Singh with fellow students at Somerville Hall, Oxford University, 1893

Singh and her older sister Bamba were educated at Somerville College, Oxford. During this period she received private instruction in violin and singing. She was also given swimming lessons. She was considered the prettiest among the three sisters; she and her sisters were debutantes at Buckingham Palace in 1895, dressed gracefully in fashionable white silk. Like her sister Sophia, Catherine also became a suffragist. She was a member of the Fawcett Women's Suffrage Group and the National Union of Women's Suffrage Societies (NUWSS), also known as the Suffragists.

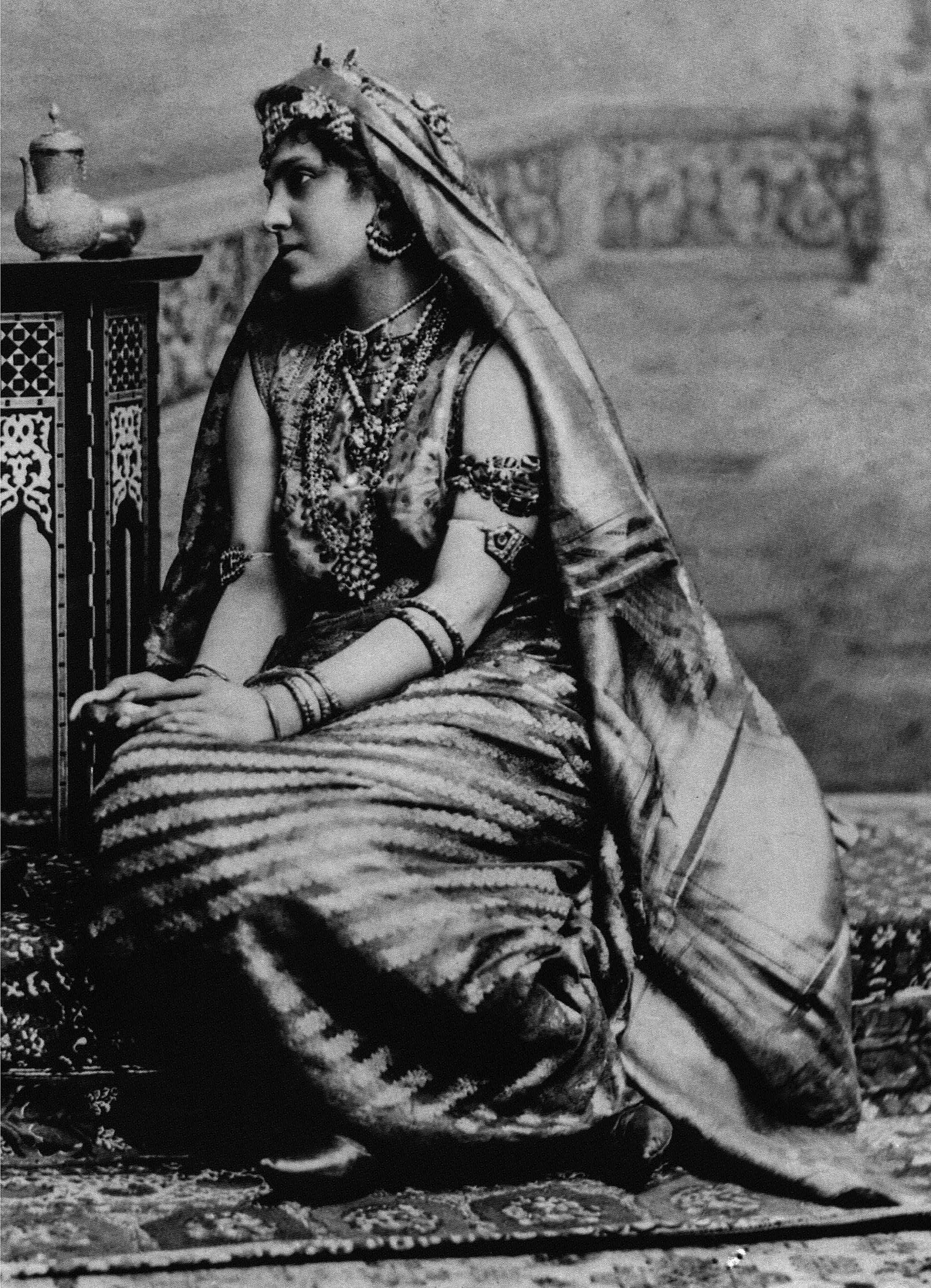
Princess Catherine Hilda Duleep Singh (before 1940)

In 1903, she toured India, went to her ancestral home in Lahore and other places such as Kashmir, Dalhousie, Simla, and Amritsar. She also visited the princely states of Kapurthala, Nabha, Jind, and Patiala and interacted with both the royalty and the local people. After her return from India in March 1904 she lived in Europe with her former governess Lina Schäfer in the Black Forest, in Kassel and in Dresden and also visited her family in Switzerland.

Singh spent most of her adult life with Lina Schäfer. During World War I she lived with Schäfer in Germany at the risk of being called a traitor. None of the family members seemed to have opposed this relationship, which Catherine is said to have appreciated. When the Nazis came to power, on the advice of Dr. Fritz Ratig, her neighbour and accountant, she left Germany in November 1937 after disposing of all her property and moved to England via Switzerland. Schäfer died on 26 August 1938 at the age of 79,

=== Death ===
Catherine Singh died due to a heart attack on 8 November 1942 at Penn. On the evening of her death she and her sister Sophia had attended a drama in the village, dined in Colehatch House, and retired for the night. The next morning, when the maid attending Singh found her room locked, she informed Sophia who rushed and broke open the door and found her sister dead. The doctor declared her death as due to heart failure. Sophia was inconsolable at her sister's death. She was the only relative who attended the cremation of Singh due to World War II. In memory of her sister, Sophia renamed the Colehatch House "Hilden Hall", adding Catherine's middle name, and sealed the room where she had died. Her last surviving sister took her ashes to Germany so that they could be placed with Lina's remains.

When Catherine Singh died she left a will dated 1935 in which she stated "I, Princess Catherine Hilda Duleep Singh desire to be cremated and the ashes buried at Elveden in Suffolk. I give my gold jewellery, my long pearl necklace and my wearing apparel to my sisters Princess Bamba Sofia Jindan Sutherland and Princess Sophia Alexandra Duleep Singh". In a codicil she had also requested that a quarter of her ashes be "buried as near as possible to the coffin of my friend Fräulein Lina Schäfer at the Principal Cemetery at Kassel in Germany". However, there was no mention of a bank account and a vault in her name in a Swiss bank in Zurich, which were revealed to the public many years later.

== Legacy in Swiss bank ==
In July 1997 a news item appeared which was related to a list of more than 5,000 dormant accounts in Swiss banks published by the Swiss Bankers Association at the insistence of Holocaust survivors. This list contained the name of the Princess with the address recorded as "Duleep Singh, Catherine (Princess), last heard of in 1942 living in Penn, Bucks", as one of the account holders. These accounts had not been operated since the end of the Second World War.

There were a large number of claimants to the joint account of the Princess with her governess Lina Schäfer, from the Government of India and relatives in Punjab and Pakistan. There were no recorded living direct descendants of the family as none of Duleep Singh's children had any offspring. A three-member Claims Resolution Tribunal was set up in Zurich to process the claims.

During the three years of hearings on the claims of various parties held by the tribunal, the Government of India's claim was considered untenable as the princess had not ruled over any princely state and her account in the bank was private. The tribunal also rejected all the claims from her relations in India and Europe.

The tribunal then identified the Supra family of Pakistan as potential beneficiaries. Catherine's 1935 will had named her sister Bamba as a beneficiary, and in 1942 Bamba, who was also childless, had bequeathed her fortune to her caretaker-cum-tutor Supra. The tribunal then gave its award in favour of Supra's "five living sons – four in Pakistan and one in India – and his deceased daughter's children would receive an equal share of the assets besides the interest on the amount". The assets totalled 137,323 Swiss Francs (Rs 39.8 lakh).

== Ancestry ==
Ancestors of Catherine Duleep Singh

Budha Singh
Naudh Singh
Sardar Charat Singh
8. Sardar Maha Singh
4. High King Ranjit Singh of Punjab
9. Raj Kaur
2. High King Duleep Singh of Punjab
10. Manna Singh
5. Jind Kaur
1. Princess Catherine Duleep Singh
6. Ludwig Müller
3. Bamba Müller
7. Sofiá

== Bibliography ==
- Anand, Anita (2015). Sophia: Princess, Suffragette, Revolutionary. Bloomsbury Publishing. ISBN 978-1-4088-3546-3.
- Singh, Gurharpal; Tatla, Darsham Singh (2006). Sikhs in Britain: The Making of a Community. Zed Books. p. 45. ISBN 978-1-84277-717-6.
- Visram, Rozina (2002). Asians In Britain: 400 Years of History. Pluto Press. ISBN 978-0-7453-1378-8.
