= Pauline Duleep Singh =

Anglo-Indian princess

- Born: 16 December 1887; Moscow, Russia
- Died: 10 April 1941 (aged 53); Pau, France
Names
- Princess Pauline Alexandrina/Alexandra Duleep Singh

Pauline Duleep Singh (26 December 1887 – 10 April 1941) was an Anglo-Indian royal who was the daughter of Maharaja Duleep Singh and his second wife, Ada Wetherill, an Englishwoman. Compared to her more famous half-sisters from Duleep Singh's first marriage, comparatively little is known about Princess Pauline and her younger sister Irene.

== Early life ==
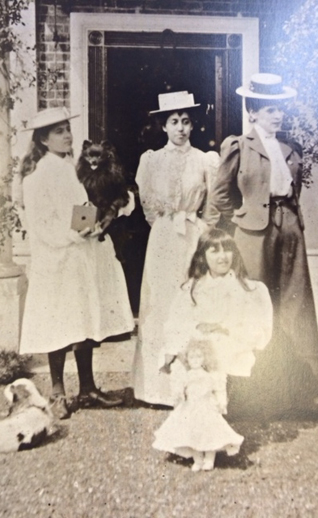
Group photo of Princess Pauline Duleep Singh (left), Princess Irene Duleep Singh (bottom), one of her three half-sisters (centre), and her mother Maharani Ada (Ada Douglas-Wetherill, right), ca.1890's

Pauline Alexandrina Duleep Singh was born out-of-wedlock to parents Maharaja Duleep Singh and Ada Douglas-Wetherill on 26 December 1887 in Moscow, Russia in a dilapidated boarding house. Her father had children from his first marriage to Bamba Müller who were Queen Victoria's godchildren. The same acknowledgement was not extended to Pauline or Irene Duleep Singh.

At the time of her birth, her father, the last Maharaja of the Sikh Empire, was in Russia planning with Russian agents on freeing Punjab and the Indian subcontinent from British colonial-rule. She was baptized as a Christian during a family holiday in Algiers in the winter of 1892.

She was chosen as the Girls in Pearls for Country Life in January 1911. In 1914, Pauline married John Shirley Archibald Torry, who belonged to the 2nd Lieutenant of the 12th Battalion Rifle Brigade. However, her husband died shortly after their marriage on 19 September 1915 during the Battle of Loos.

== Relations with half-siblings ==
She had maintained a friendship with her half-sister, Princess Sophia Duleep Singh, visiting the familial home at Norfolk and Old Buckenham Hall. She occasionally met her half-siblings at Blo’ Norton Hall. However, her relationship with her half-siblings became strained after the suicide of her sister Irene in 1926 due to Princess Bamba making a claim to the inheritance of Irene. After a costly and lengthy legal dispute, Pauline was determined to be the sole recipient of her sister's will. As a result of this, the relationships between Pauline and her half-siblings was damaged permanently.

=== Legal dispute over Irene's estate ===
After the death of Pauline’s full-sister Irene, her inheritance (estate worth over £20,000–30,000) was contested between Pauline and her half-sister Bamba, which permanently strained their relations there-after. Originally, Irene had bequeathed her inheritance to her sister, Pauline. However, one day prior to her suicide she had instead gotten a new will made that gave all her inheritance to a charity named Dr Barnardo's Home for Poor and Unwanted Children. Pauline contested the new will on the basis of her sister not having a sound state of mind at the time. However, for unknown reasons, Princess Bamba also contested the will and claimed to be its true beneficiary and tried to destroy the reputation of her half-sister Pauline, however Catherine and Sophia did not join her legal battle and separated themselves from the affair. Bamba hired Sir Ellis Hume-Williams as a lawyer and had private medical-records of the late Irene revealed. The court ruled entirely in-favour of Irene's surviving sister Pauline and Bamba was ordered to pay the £3,600 legal fees for both the plaintiff and defendant. However, Bamba never paid the cost. The relationship between Pauline and her half-sisters never recovered after the legal case and she moved to France.

== Move to France and death ==
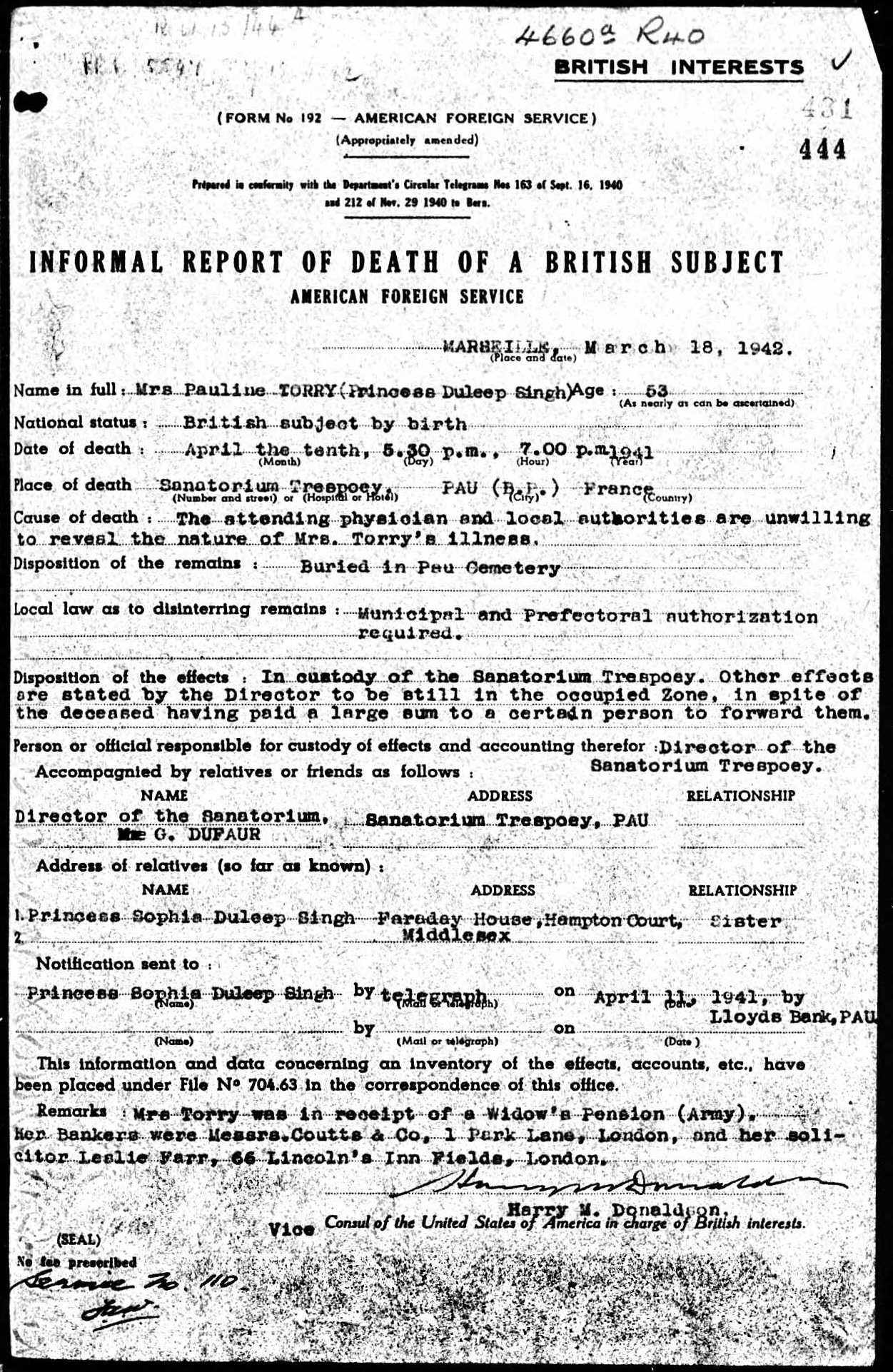
Death report for Princess Pauline Duleep Singh, American Foreign Service, Marseille, France, 12 March 1942

Her fate and death were unknown for many decades until it was discovered by genealogical researcher from a distant relative of her late husband, who tipped off Peter Bance in October 2014, confirming what happened to Pauline. During the late 1930s, Pauline had moved to Paris, France due to her poor relations with her half-siblings in the UK. However, she maintained limited contact with Catherine and Sophia until the outbreak of World War II, when she was not heard from again, with theories arising that she had either been killed in bombing campaigns or in a concentration camp. In the 1950s, Ganda Singh interviewed Bamba in Lahore for his book Maharajah Duleep Singh and His Correspondence and inquired if she knew what happened to her half-sister Pauline but she did not know. It was much later discovered that she had contracted tuberculosis and died at the Sanatorium de Trespoey in Pau, France on 10 April 1941 estranged from her family during World War II, with her being buried at Pau Cemetery, but her remains were later moved to an unmarked grave there to make space for other burials. Her death certificate, last will and testament, and also a death report of a foreign subject in France, were subsequently discovered.

== Ancestry ==
Ancestors of Pauline Duleep Singh

Budha Singh
Naudh Singh
Sardar Charat Singh
8. Sardar Maha Singh
4. High King Ranjit Singh of Punjab
9. Raj Kaur
2. High King Duleep Singh of Punjab
10. Manna Singh
5. Jind Kaur
1. Princess Pauline Duleep Singh
3. Ada Douglas-Wetherill
