= The Black Prince (film) =

2017 film directed by Kavi Raz

- Promotional poster for "The Black Prince"
- Directed by: Kavi Raz
- Produced by: Brillstein Entertainment Partners
- Starring: Satinder Sartaj; Amanda Root; Jason Flemyng; Atul Sharma; Rup Magon
- Cinematography: Aaron C. Smith
- Music by: George Kallis
- Release date: 21 July 2017 (worldwide)
- Running time: 118 minutes
- Countries: India; United Kingdom; United States
- Languages: English; Hindi; Punjabi
- Box office: $639,198

The Black Prince is a 2017 international historical drama film directed by Kavi Raz and featuring the acting debut of Satinder Sartaaj. It tells the story of Duleep Singh, the last Maharajah of the Sikh Empire and the Punjab region, and his relationship with Queen Victoria.

The story revolves around the young prince as he attempts both to regain his throne and reconcile with the two cultures of his Indian birth and British education.

== Plot ==
After the death of his father, Maharajah Ranjit Singh, the previous ruler of the Sikh empire, Maharaja Duleep Singh is placed on the throne at the age of five. In 1849, when Punjab is annexed to British India, the young prince is removed from the throne and separated from his mother. He is put under the guardianship of British surgeon Dr. John Login. At the age of 15, Duleep Singh is sent to England where he meets Queen Victoria. A relationship between the two develops.

Duleep Singh is eventually able to reestablish contact with his mother and as a result begins to reconnect with the culture of his birth. Duleep attempts to return to India to reclaim his kingdom, but is continually thwarted by British colonial politics.

== Cast ==
- Satinder Sartaaj as Duleep Singh
- Amanda Root as Queen Victoria
- Jason Flemyng as Dr Login
- Ameet Chana as Aziz-Ud-din
- Joe Egan as Ishris Reval
- David Essex as Colonel Hurban
- Madhurima Tuli as Young Maharani Jinda
- Shabana Azmi as Maharani Jinda
- Keith Duffy as Casey
- Kumud Pant as Arur Singh's Protect Soldier
- Atul Sharma as Hotel Manager
- Leanne Joyce as Ada Wetherill
- James Weber Brown as General Charles Carroll Tevis
- Arinder Sadhra as Mangla
- Lyndon Ogbourne Sir O Butan
- Sandeep Bhojak as Duleep Singh's Protect Soldier
- Sophie Stevens as Bamba Muller
- Ranjit Singh Shubh as Thakur Singh
- Malcolm Freeman as Brigadier General Hogg
- Jobanpreet Singh as Herra Singh
- Emma Kenny as Lady Login
- Tony Hasnath as Victor Duleep Singh
- Adeera Brar as Sophia Duleep Singh
- Ana Correia as the prince's bride Catherine Duleep Singh
- Courtney Sinclair as a Victorian lady

== Production ==
=== Development ===
Written and directed by Los Angeles-based Indian filmmaker Kavi Raz, The Black Prince stars the singer Satinder Sartaaj in his acting debut.

On the relationship between Duleep and the Queen, producer Jasjeet Singh noted: "What’s striking is that the British government treated him terribly, but throughout his life, there was a relationship of great fondness between him and Queen Victoria."

The Black Prince was produced by Brillstein Entertainment Partners; it is a bilingual English-Hindi production. The movie is set in India and the UK.

=== Music ===
George Kallis composed the music for The Black Prince.

The lead actor, Sartaaj, also wrote and performed some of the songs appearing in the film

== Release ==
The Black Prince premiered at the Manchester Film Festival on 3 March 2017 and was released worldwide on 21 July 2017. It was also released in two dubbed versions: Punjabi and Hindi.

== Reception ==
=== Critical response ===
The Black Prince has received generally unfavorable reviews, with most critics decrying the slow pacing as letting down the genuinely interesting subject matter, the Hindustan Times critic said: "The script is sluggish and painfully slow paced."

Of the actors, Shabana Azmi, playing the prince's mother Rani Jindan, was singled out as one of the better performers.

As of December 2023, 7% of the 14 reviews compiled by Rotten Tomatoes are positive and have an average score of 4.1 out of 10.

=== Box office ===
According to Box Office Mojo, The Black Prince has grossed $633,000 in three territories. The film grossed $194,000 in its opening weekend, with $106,000 earned in the United Kingdom, $8,000 in New Zealand and $80,000 in Australia.

== See also ==
- Maharaja Duleep Singh
