= Duleep Singh =

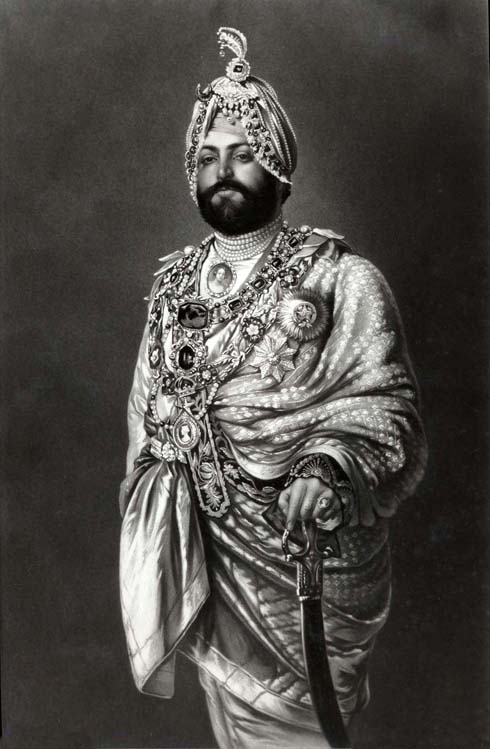
- Maharaja Sir Duleep Singh in 1875, aged 37

Maharaja of Punjab, Kashmir and Jammu
- Reign: 15 September 1843 – 29 March 1849
- Predecessor: Sher Singh
- Successor: Office abolished
- Regent: Maharani Jind Kaur
- Vizier: Hira Singh Dogra; Jawahar Singh Aulakh; Lal Singh
- Born: 6 September 1838; Lahore, Sikh Empire
- Died: 22 October 1893 (aged 55); Paris, France
- Spouse: Bamba Müller (m. 1864; died 1887) Ada Douglas Wetherill (m. 1889)
- Issue: By Bamba Müller: Prince Victor Duleep Singh; Prince Frederick Duleep Singh; Princess Bamba Sutherland; Princess Catherine Duleep Singh; Princess Sophia Duleep Singh; Prince Albert Edward Alexander Duleep Singh; By Ada Wetherill: Princess Pauline Alexandra Duleep Singh; Princess Ada Irene Beryl Duleep Singh
- House: Sukerchakia
- Father: Maharaja Ranjit Singh
- Mother: Maharani Jind Kaur
- Religion: by birth Sikhism (1838—1853) later Protestantism (1853—1886) reverted to Sikhism (1886—his death)
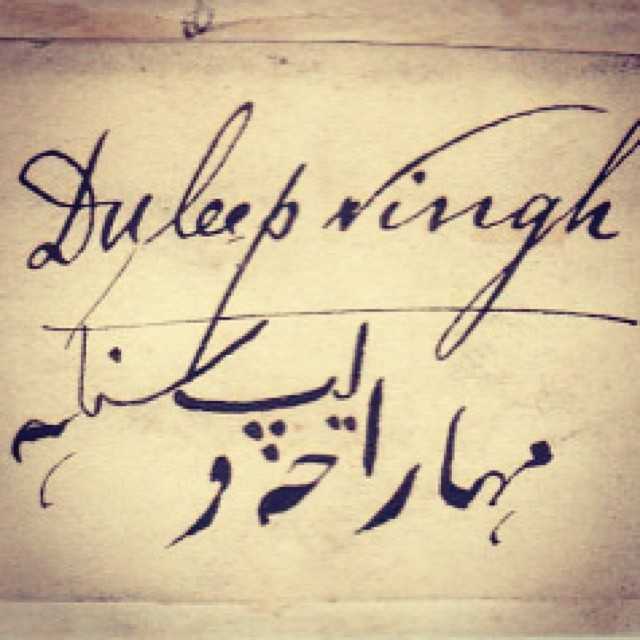
- Signature

Maharaja Sir Duleep Singh GCSI (6 September 1838 – 22 October 1893), also spelled Dalip Singh, and later in life nicknamed the "Black Prince of Perthshire", was the last Maharaja of the Sikh Empire. He was Maharaja Ranjit Singh's youngest son, the only child of Maharani Jind Kaur.

He was placed in power in September 1843, at the age of five, with his mother ruling on his behalf, and after their defeat in the Anglo-Sikh War, under a British Resident. He was subsequently deposed by the British East India Company and thereafter exiled to Britain at age 15 where he was befriended by Queen Victoria, who is reported to have written of the Punjabi Maharaja: "Those eyes and those teeth are too beautiful". The Queen was godmother to several of his children. He died at 55 in Paris, otherwise living most of his final years in the United Kingdom.

His mother had effectively ruled when he was very young and he managed to meet her again on 16 January 1861, in Calcutta and return with her to the United Kingdom. During the last two years of her life, his mother told the Maharaja about his Sikh heritage and the Empire which once had been his to rule. In June 1861, he was one of the first 25 Knights in the Order of the Star of India.

== Early years ==
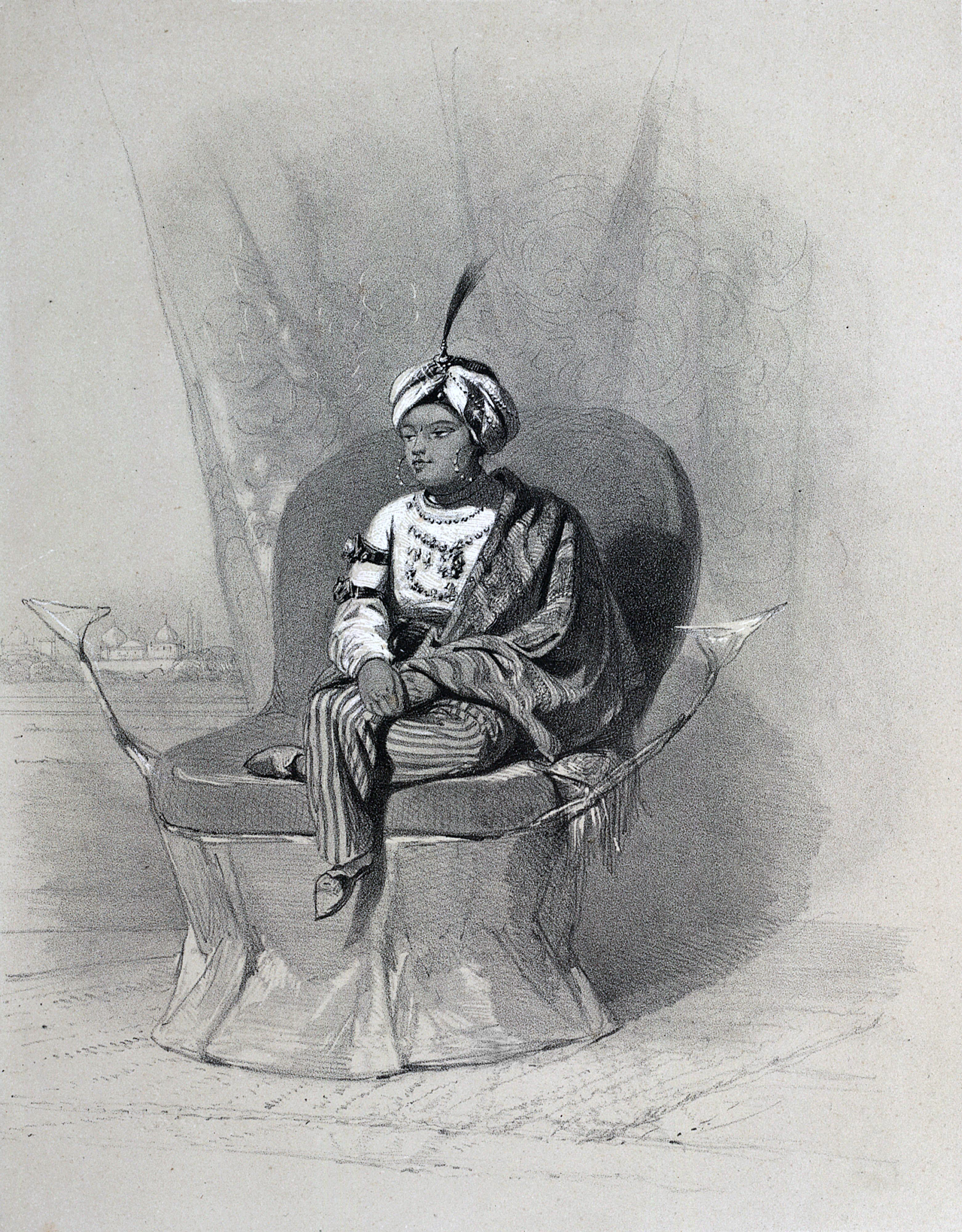
A young Duleep Singh

After the death of Maharaja Ranjit Singh in 1839, Duleep Singh lived quietly with his mother, Jind Kaur Aulakh, at Jammu ruled by Gulab Singh, under the protection of the Vizier, Raja Dhian Singh. He and his mother were recalled to Lahore in 1843 after the assassinations of Maharaja Sher Singh and Dhian Singh, and on 16 September, at the age of five, Duleep Singh was proclaimed Maharaja of the Sikh Empire by the Panch (Military Council), with Maharani Jind Kaur as Regent. He was betrothed to Tej Kaur, the granddaughter of Sham Singh Attariwala. However, this betrothal would not be honoured once he came under British guardianship.

Due to divisions and factionalism (including covert British activities), Jind Kaur was advised to weaken the strength and influence of the Sikh Army by pre-occupying it with a war with the East India Company, leading to the First Anglo-Sikh War. On 13 December 1845 the British East India Company declared war on the Sikhs and, after winning the First Anglo-Sikh War, retained the Maharaja as nominal ruler, but replaced the Maharani with a Council of Regency and later imprisoned and exiled her. Over thirteen years passed before Duleep Singh was permitted to see his mother again.

After the end of the Second Anglo-Sikh War and the subsequent annexation of the Punjab on 29 March 1849, he was deposed at the age of ten. Duleep Singh was instructed that he was allowed to live anywhere but Punjab and was given a 120,000 rupee (£50,000) pension per annum. His property worth 15 million rupees was dispossessed of him by the British, including the famed Koh-i-Noor diamond. He was put into the care of Dr John Login and sent from Lahore to Fatehgarh on 21 December 1849, with tight restrictions on who he was allowed to meet. No Indians, except trusted servants, could meet him in private. As a matter of Company policy, he was to be culturally Anglicised in every possible aspect. His health was reportedly poor and he was often sent to the hill station of Landour near Mussoorie in the Lower Himalayas for convalescence, at the time about four days' journey. He would remain for weeks at a time in Landour at a grand hilltop building called The Castle, which had been lavishly furnished to accommodate him.

Duleep Singh eventually moved to Britain. Khushwant Singh narrated the reasons that motivated him to do so:

Maharajah Dalip Singh was only ten when his kingdom was annexed. In those ten years he had seen his mother grossly insulted by low upstarts, exploited by the ambitious, and misused by men of lust; he had seen relations and friends murdered before his eyes, and he had seen the best of men behave in the vilest manner. He was seated on the throne and had his feet kissed in public by men who had no compunction in calling him a bastard when they wanted to. He wore the world’s greatest diamond on his arm but was denied expenses to maintain himself and his mother with dignity. He was a frightened, effeminate young man who had had enough of the Punjab and the Punjabis and wanted nothing better than to get away from both.

— Khushwant Singh, The Fall of the Kingdom of Punjab

After Duleep expressed a desire to become an English country-gentleman and move to England, Dalhousie was initially skeptical of the idea but decided to send Shahdeo Singh to accompany Duleep Singh to England. This was because Shahdeo Singh was also a potential claimant to the former Sikh throne and Dalhousie thought it would benefit the British mission to send him off to England alongside his now Christian relative Duleep. In May 1854, Duleep was sent into exile in Britain.

=== Conversion to Christianity ===
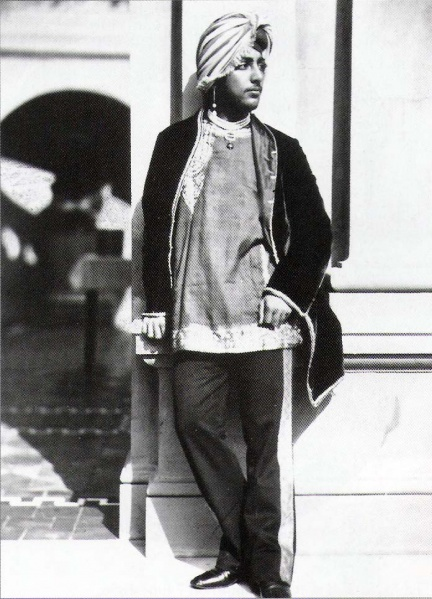
Duleep Singh, aged 16, on the Lower Terrace of Osborne House, Isle of Wight in 1854

He was also heavily and continuously exposed to Christian texts under the tutelage of the devout Sir John Spencer Login. His two closest childhood friends were both English Anglican missionaries. After two months under Dr. Login's tutelage at Fatehgarh, on 8 March 1853, also under the two Brahmin retainers Purohit Golab Rai and Bhagun Lal (himself a Christian convert), Duleep converted to Christianity at Fatehgarh Sahib with the approval of the Governor-General Lord Dalhousie. His conversion remains controversial, and it occurred before he turned 15. He later had serious doubts and regrets regarding this decision and reconverted to Sikhism in 1886. Dalhousie celebrated his conversion to Christianity as it would destroy any remaining influence Duleep had in the Punjab, with the Sikhs no longer acknowleding Duleep as their maharaja as a result. After two years of probation, Duleep's hair was cut and he was baptized into the Christian faith. Dalhousie gifted Duleep Singh a copy of the Bible as a parting gift.

== Life in exile ==
=== London ===
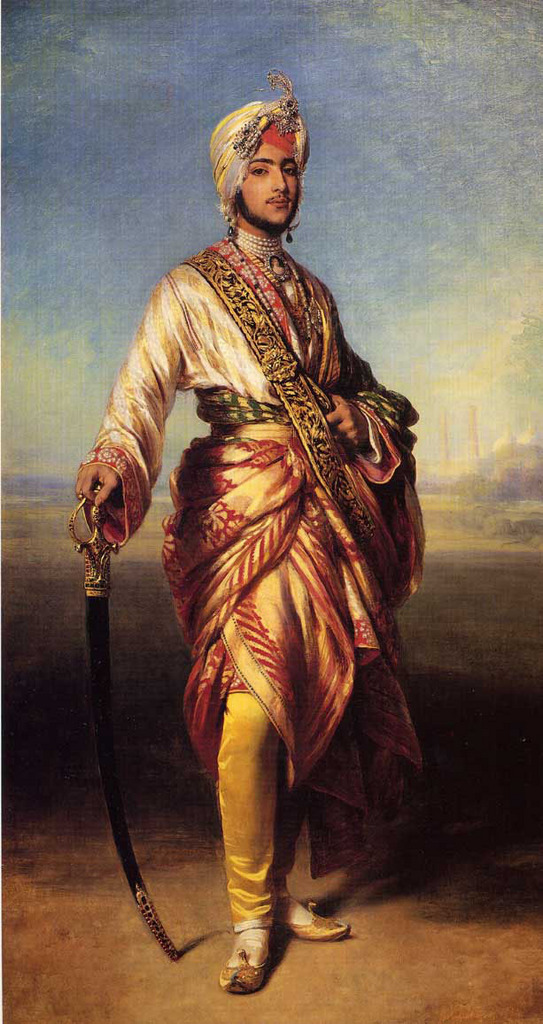
Duleep Singh (1838–1893) in 1854; portrait by Franz Xaver Winterhalter

Duleep Singh arrived in England in late 1854 and was introduced to the British court. Queen Victoria showered affection upon the turbaned Maharaja, as did the Prince Consort. Duleep Singh was initially lodged at Claridge's Hotel in London before the East India Company took over a house in Wimbledon and then eventually another house in Roehampton which became his home for three years. He was also invited by the Queen to stay with the Royal Family at Osborne, where she sketched him playing with her children and Prince Albert photographed him, while the court artist, Winterhalter, made his portrait. Duleep Singh was treated as a godson by Queen Victoria, often visiting Buckingham Palace.

He eventually got bored with Roehampton and expressed a wish to go back to India but it was suggested by the East India Company Board he take a tour of the European continent, which he did with Sir John Spencer Login and Lady Login. He was a member of the Photographic Society, later the Royal Photographic Society, from 1855 until his death.

=== Castle Menzies ===
On his return from Continental Europe in 1855 he was given an annual pension of £25,000 a year (approximately £2,300,000 in today's value) provided he "remain obedient to the British Government," and was officially under ward of Sir John Spencer Login and Lady Login, who leased Castle Menzies in Perthshire, Scotland, for him. He spent the rest of his teens there, but at 19 he demanded to be in charge of his household. Eventually, he was given this and an increase in his annual pension.

In 1859 Lt Col James Oliphant was installed as Equerry to the Maharaja at the recommendation of Sir John Login. Oliphant was to be a possible replacement should anything happen to the Maharaja's most trusted friend Sir John Login (who did indeed die four years later in 1863).

In the 1860s, Singh moved from Castle Menzies to Grandtully Castle. Eventually Duleep Singh was given a £40,000 per year pension and an estate in the county of Suffolk.

=== Mulgrave Castle ===
From 1858 to 1862 Duleep Singh rented Mulgrave Castle, near Whitby.

=== Sir Samuel White Baker ===
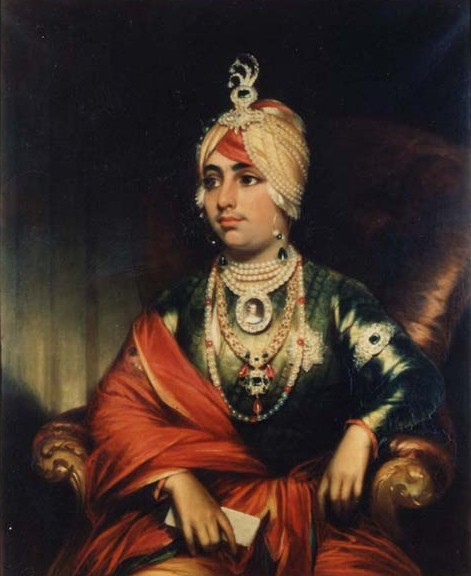
Duleep Singh, in ceremonial dress, 1852, by the English painter George Duncan Beechey

While Sir Samuel White Baker was visiting the Duke of Atholl on his shooting estate in Scotland, he befriended Maharaja Duleep Singh. In 1858–1859, the two partnered an extensive hunting trip in central Europe and the Balkans, via Frankfurt, Berlin, Vienna and Budapest. On the last part of the voyage, Baker and the Maharajah hired a wooden boat in Budapest, which was eventually abandoned on the frozen Danube. The two continued into Vidin where, to amuse the Maharajah, Baker went to the Vidin slave market. There, Baker fell in love with a white slave girl, destined for the Ottoman Pasha of Vidin. Baker was outbid by the Pasha but bribed the girl's attendants. The two ran away in a carriage together and eventually, as Florence Baker, she became Baker's lover and later wife and accompanied him everywhere he journeyed.

=== Reunion with his mother ===
In 1861, Duleep Singh was allowed to return to India on a short trip, returning with his mother. When he was 18, Singh wrote to his mother in Kathmandu, suggesting that she should join him in Great Britain, but his letter was intercepted by the British authorities in India and did not reach her. He then sent a courier, Pundit Nehemiah Goreh, who was also intercepted and forbidden to contact the Maharani. Duleep Singh then decided to go himself. Under cover of a letter from Login he wrote to the British Resident in Kathmandu, who reported that the Maharani had 'much changed, was blind and had lost much of the energy which formerly characterised her.' The British government decided she was no longer a threat and she was allowed to join her son on 16 January 1861 at Spence's Hotel in Calcutta and return with him to England. In 1863, he returned to India with the ashes of his mother after her death. Enroute to India he met Bamba Müller, the daughter of a German trader and an Abyssinian woman. Duleep Singh later married Bamba in Alexandria, with the couple living together in Suffolk and having children.

=== Auchlyne and Aberfeldy ===
In 1858 the lease of Castle Menzies expired and Duleep Singh rented the house at Auchlyne from the Earl of Breadalbane. He was known for a lavish lifestyle, shooting parties, and a love of dressing in Highland costume and soon had the nickname "the Black Prince of Perthshire". (At the same time, he was known to have gradually developed a sense of regret for his circumstances in exile, including some inner turmoil about his conversion to Christianity and his forced departure from the Punjab). His mother stayed in Perthshire with him for a short time, before he rented the Grandtully Estate, near Aberfeldy. Following the death of his mother and Sir John Login in 1863, he returned to England.

=== Elveden Estate ===
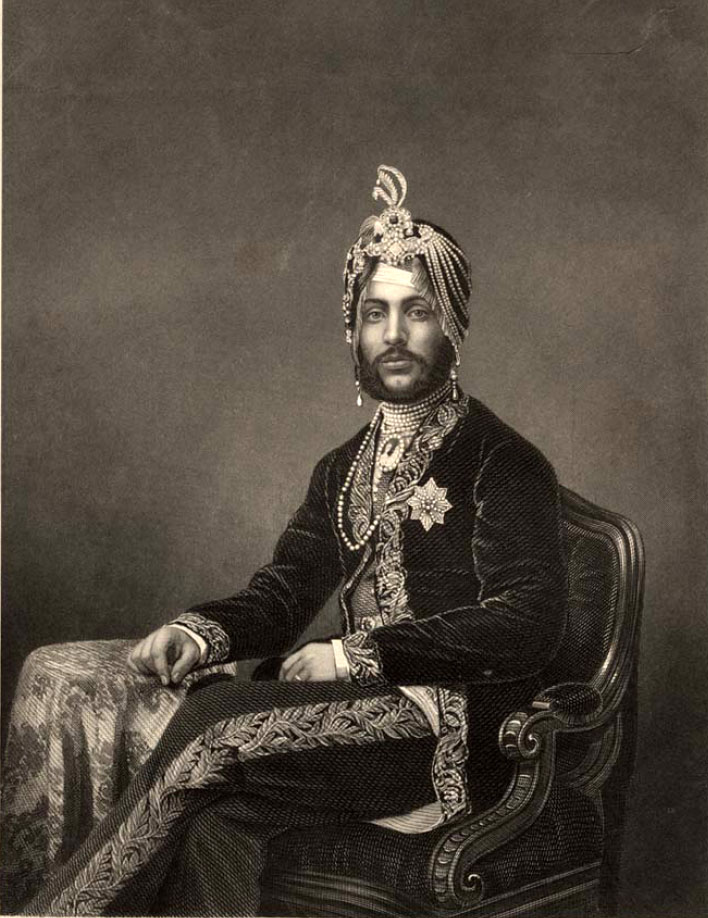
Sir Duleep Singh in the 1860s

Maharaja Duleep Singh (as he became in June 1861) bought (or the India Office purchased for him) a 17,000 acres (69 km^{2}) country estate at Elveden on the border between Norfolk and Suffolk, close to Thetford, in 1863. He enjoyed living in Elveden Hall and the surrounding area and restored the church, cottages, and school. He transformed the run-down estate into an efficient game preserve and it was here that he gained his reputation as the fourth best shot in England.

The house was remodelled into a quasi-oriental palace where he lived the life of a British aristocrat. Maharaja Duleep Singh was accused of running up large expenses and the estate was sold after his death to pay his debts. Today, Elveden is owned by Edward Guinness, 4th Earl of Iveagh, the head of the Anglo-Irish Guinness family of brewing fame; it remains an operating farm and private hunting estate.

== Effort to restore his throne ==
In 1864, Duleep Singh married Bamba Müller in Alexandria and established his family home at Elveden Hall in Suffolk. He eventually became disaffected and embittered with the British and their social culture, suffering from debts and creditors after he and his family began living beyond their means. The main reason for him trying to restore the throne were financial issues, as he lost most of his capital in gambling and the British reduced his pension.

Duleep Singh reverted to Sikhism and began communicating with Sikh sardars and Indian princes from his homeland. There were two camps that attempted to restore Duleep Singh to the Sikh throne. The first was led by Thakur Singh Sandhawalia, who got into contact with Duleep Singh by 1870 and alerted him about the confiscated property of the former Sikh Empire. Thakur re-initiated Duleep back into Sikhism and convinced Duleep Singh that he was prophesized to return to Punjab, regain his lost throne, and become the eleventh guru of Sikhism. The second group was the Namdharis, who initially did not have a high opinion of Duleep Singh but began supporting the idea of Duleep Singh being restored as the Sikh emperor after he was arrested in Aden en-route to India, believing that their guru Ram Singh's spirit entered Duleep Singh.

While in exile, he sought to learn more about Sikhism and was eager to return to India. Though previous efforts were thwarted by his handlers, he re-established contact with his cousin Sardar Thakar Singh Sandhawalia, who on 28 September 1884 left Amritsar for England along with his sons Narinder Singh and Gurdit Singh and a Sikh granthi (priest), Pratap Singh Giani. He also brought a list of properties held by Sir Duleep Singh in India. All this renewed his connection with Sikhism.

The British Government decided in 1886 against his return to India or his re-embracing Sikhism. Despite protests from the India Office, he set sail for 'home' on 30 March 1886. However, he was intercepted and arrested in Aden, then part of Aden Settlement, where the writ of the Viceroy of India began. He could not be stopped from an informal re-conversion ceremony in Aden, far less grand and symbolic than it would have been in India, done by emissaries sent by Sardar Thakar Singh Sandhawalia, who was earlier planning the Pahaul ceremony at Bombay. Duleep was forced to return to Europe.

This experience left him more bitter against the British and he began to view himself as a foe against the British. He attempted to establish ties with other European powers (such as the French, Germans, and Russians) and set-up himself as an exiled government, with a Sandhawalia member being appointed as the Chief Minister. For several years, Duleep threatened to launch an invasion of India through the North-West Frontier but this was not taken seriously. Eventually, Duleep Singh apologized to Queen Victoria for his past behaviour and resumed his British lifestyle, his pension was resumed.

== Death ==
Maharaja Duleep Singh died inside a hotel in Paris on 23 October 1893, having seen India after the age of fifteen during only two brief, tightly controlled visits in 1861 (to bring his mother to England) and in 1863 (to cremate his mother's body).

Maharaja Duleep Singh's wish for his body to be returned to India was not honoured, in fear of unrest, given the symbolic value the funeral of the son of the Lion of the Punjab might have caused and the growing resentment of British rule. His body was brought back to be buried according to Christian rites, under the supervision of the India Office, in Elveden Church beside the grave of his wife Maharani Bamba, and his son Prince Edward Albert Duleep Singh. The graves are located on the west side of the Church.

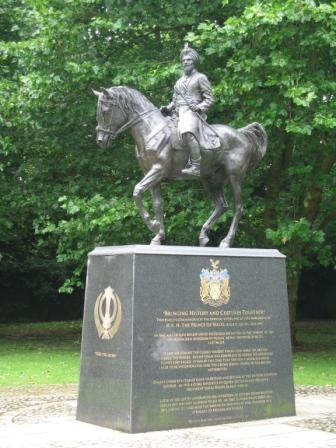
Statue of Duleep Singh on Butten Island, Thetford

A life-size bronze statue, by Denise Dutton, of the Maharaja, showing him on a horse, was unveiled by the then Prince of Wales in 1999 at Butten Island in Thetford, a town which benefited from his and his sons' generosity.

In an auction at Bonhams, London in April 2007, the 74cm high white marble portrait bust of Singh by John Gibson, sculpted in Rome in 1859, sold for £1.5 million plus premium and tax.

A film titled Maharaja Duleep Singh: A Monument Of Injustice, was made in 2007, directed by P.S. Narula.

== Heraldry ==
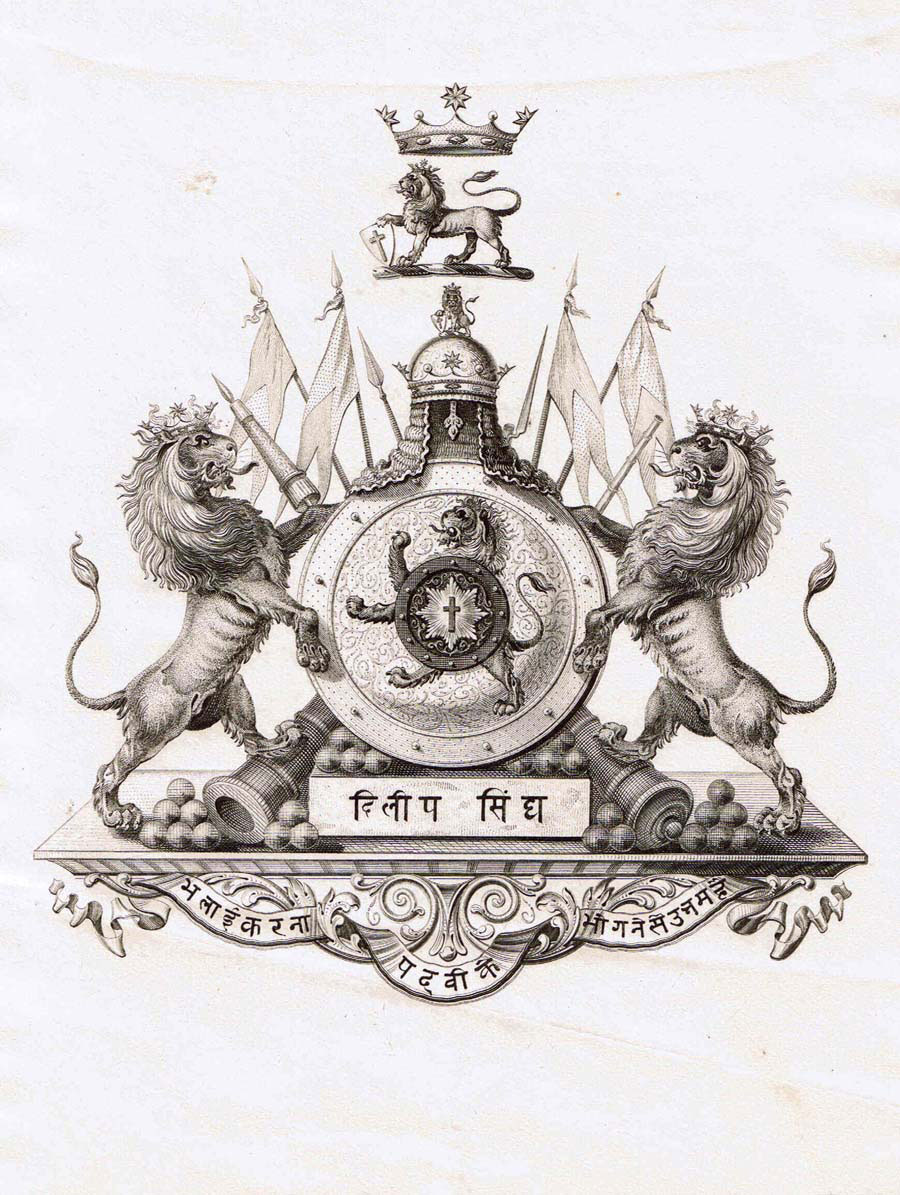
Bookplate of Duleep Singh

The Maharaja and his family used a coat of arms which was drawn up by Prince Albert, despite not being registered at the College of Arms. It contained a coronet, lions, and a shield with a cross, along with the motto "Prodesse quam conspicii" ("to do good rather than be conspicuous").

Coat of arms of Duleep Singh
Coronet Naval coronet Crest A Sikh symbol upon a naval coronet Escutcheon Two swords argent saltire proper Supporters On either side a Lion rampant or

== Family ==
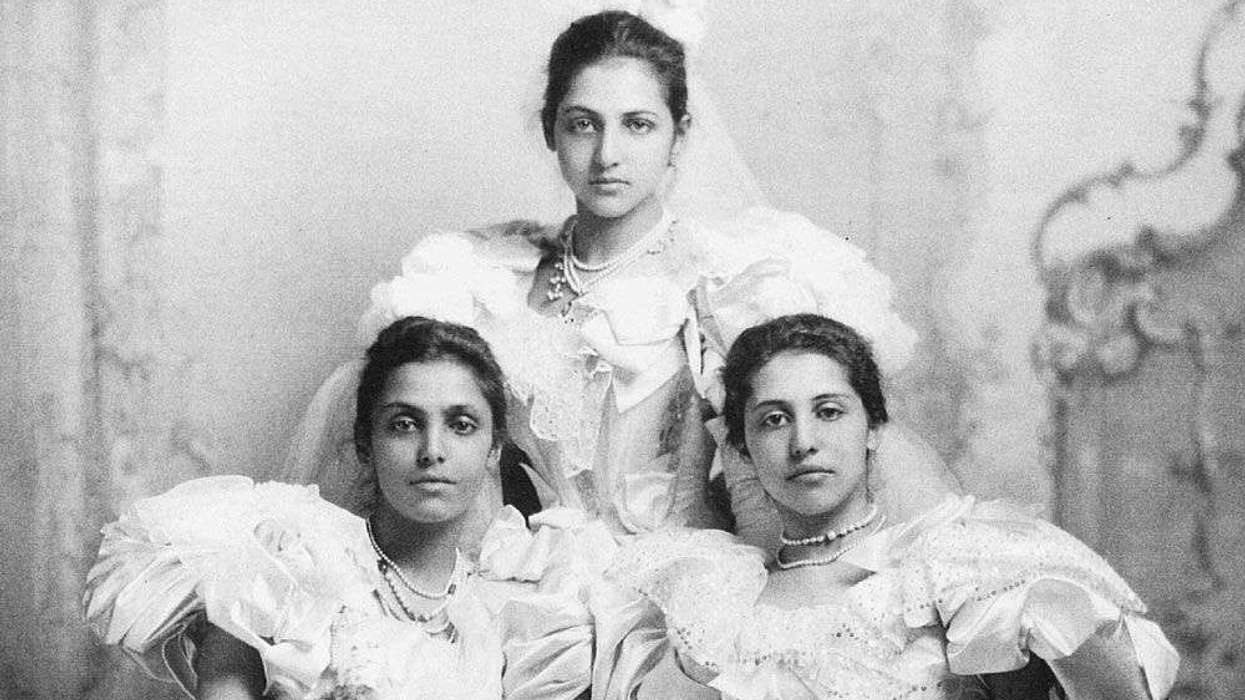
Photograph of three daughters (Sophia, Bamba, and Catherine) of Maharaja Duleep Singh and Bamba Müller in May 1895

Sir Duleep Singh married twice, first to Bamba Müller in 1864, and then to Ada Douglas Wetherill (1869-1930) in 1889. He had nine children in total.

He had seven children from his marriage to Bamba. Their first child and male heir died aged one day in 1865. The others were:

- Prince Victor Albert Jay Duleep Singh (10 Jan 1866–7 Jun 1918)
- Prince Frederick Victor Duleep Singh (23 Jan 1868–15 Aug 1926)
- Princess Bamba Sofia Jindan Duleep Singh (29 Sep 1869–10 Mar 1957)
- Princess Catherine Hilda Duleep Singh (27 Oct 1871–8 Nov 1942)
- Princess Sophia Alexandra Duleep Singh (8 Aug 1876–22 Aug 1948)
- Prince Albert Edward Alexander Duleep Singh (1879–1 May 1893)

He also had two children from his marriage to Wetherill:

- Princess Pauline Alexandrina Duleep Singh (26 Dec 1887–10 Apr 1941)
- Princess Ada Irene Beryl Duleep Singh (25 Oct 1889–14 Sep 1926)

All the eight children died without legitimate issue, ending the direct line of the Sikh Royalty.

There is a memorial at Eton College in England to Princes Victor and Frederick, Maharaja Sir Duleep Singh's two sons who studied at Eton in the 1870s.

=== Maharani Bamba Müller ===
Maharani Bamba Müller was an Arabic-speaking, part-Ethiopian, part-German woman, whose father was a German banker and whose mother was an Abyssinian Coptic Christian slave. She and Sir Duleep met in Cairo in 1863 on his return from scattering his mother's ashes in India; they were married in Alexandria, Egypt, on 7 June 1864. The Maharani died in London on 18 September 1887.

=== Ada Douglas Wetherill ===
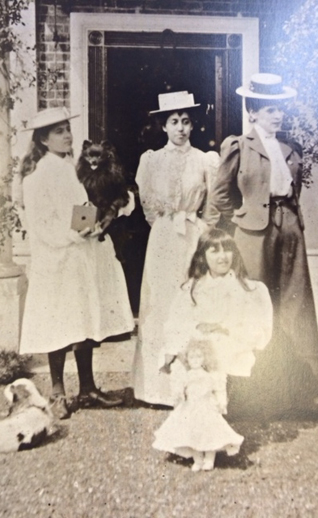
Group photo of Princess Pauline Duleep Singh, Princess Irene Duleep Singh, a half-sister, and Maharani Ada (Ada Douglas-Wetherill), ca.1890's

Ada Douglas Wetherill (born 15 January 1869 in Kennington, Surrey, the daughter of a civil engineer) had been Duleep's mistress before he decided to return to India with his family, and upon being stopped in Aden by the British authorities he abandoned his family and moved to Paris, where she joined him. They married in Paris on 28 April 1889. She stayed with him through his years in Paris and also travelled with him to St. Petersburg, Russia, where he failed to persuade the Czar Alexander III of the benefits of invading India through the north and reinstalling him as ruler. She died in Sussex on 6 August 1930.

Queen Victoria and Maharaja Duleep Singh reconciled their differences before he died. Out of loyalty to Maharani Bamba, the Queen refused to receive Ada, whom she suspected had been involved with the Maharaja before Maharani Bamba's death in 1887.

== Miscellany ==
In 1854, Madame Blavatsky, the founder of the Theosophical Society, met her Master Morya in England, who was in her words, "in the company of a dethroned native prince". This "native prince" according to general consensus was Sir Duleep Singh.

He was a member of the Freemasons and was admitted into the Grand Freemasonry Lodge of India in 1861.

On 21 October 1893, the day before Sir Duleep Singh's death, Prince Victor Duleep Singh, the eldest son of Sir Duleep Singh, had visions of his father looking at him through a picture frame.

Duleep Singh remembered his servant James Cawood who died in 1865 with a gravestone in Killin cemetery, Killin, Scotland.

== Popular culture ==
A 2017 film, The Black Prince, by the Indian-born film director Kavi Raz told the story of Duleep and his relationship with Queen Victoria.

Maharaja Duleep Singh's character is featured in Ubisoft's Assassin's Creed: Syndicate game. He is featured as a young Duleep Singh, which based on his real-life struggle as an exiled ruler in Victorian London.

Chitra Banerjee Divakaruni's 2021 novel The Last Queen: A Novel of Courage and Resistance describes Maharaja Duleep Singh through the eyes of his mother Jind Kaur.

Regnal titles
Preceded by Sher Singh	Maharaja of the Sikh Empire; 1843–1849	Succeeded by British Raj
