= Frederick Duleep Singh =

- Crown Prince of Punjab
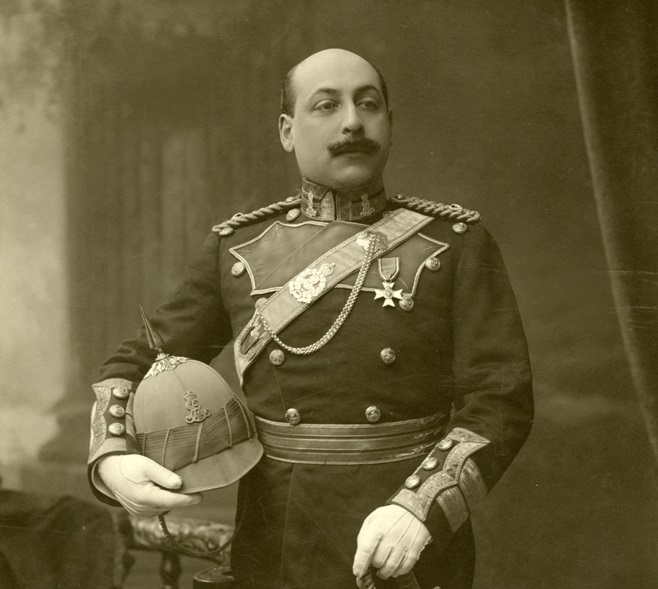
- Prince Frederick Duleep Singh

Head of the Royal House of Punjab
- Period: 7 July 1918 – 15 August 1926
- Predecessor: Victor Duleep Singh
- Successor: None (House extinct under uterine primogeniture)
- Born: Frederick Victor Duleep Singh; 23 January 1868; London, United Kingdom
- Died: 15 August 1926 (aged 58); Blo' Norton Hall, Diss, Norfolk, United Kingdom
- Burial: Blo' Norton Church
- House: Sukerchakia
- Father: Duleep Singh
- Mother: Bamba Müller
- Education: Eton College; Magdalene College, Cambridge
- Military career
- Allegiance: United Kingdom
- Branch: British Armed Forces
- Years of active service: 1893–1919
- Rank: See list
- Units: Suffolk Yeomanry; Norfolk Yeomanry
- Conflicts: World War I

Prince Frederick Victor Duleep Singh, MVO, TD, FSA (23 January 1868 – 15 August 1926), also known as Prince Freddy, was the youngest son of Sir Duleep Singh, the last Maharaja of the Sikh Empire.

== Early life ==
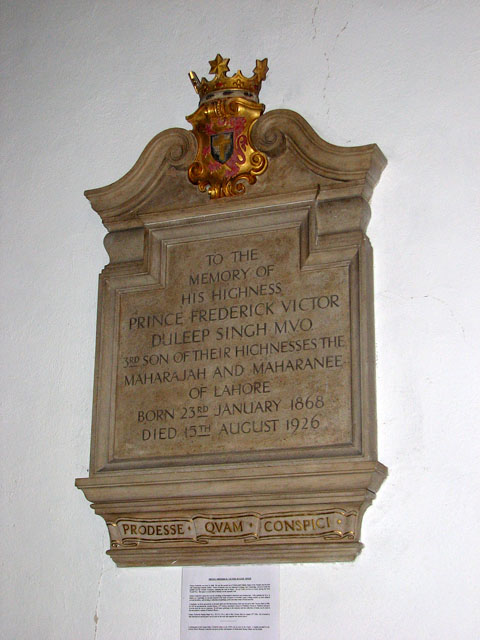
Memorial in St Andrew's church, Blo' Norton

Prince Frederick was born in London as the third son (the second surviving after the oldest son died on the first day after his birth) of Sir Duleep Singh and Bamba Müller, the former Maharaja and Maharani Duleep of Lahore.

He was educated at Eton and Magdalene College, Cambridge, where he read history (B.A. 1890; M.A. 1894). At Cambridge, he was a member of the Pitt Club.

He was deeply interested in archaeology, contributing articles to various periodicals and became a Fellow of the Society of Antiquaries. He wrote Portraits in Norfolk Houses (1929, two volumes) alongside Rev. Edmund Farrer, and with Farrer and his friend Charles Partridge compiled and published Portraits in Suffolk Houses. He was East Anglia representative of the Society for the Protection of Ancient Buildings and reported on about 50 historic building cases for it. Such was his passion for ancient buildings, under his Deed of Gift of the Ancient House, Thetford to the Town Council in 1921, he stipulated that should anyone wish to carry out any structural alterations to the building, the Society for the Protection of Ancient Buildings must be consulted first.

== Career ==
He lived at Old Buckenham Hall and for 20 years, at Blo' Norton Hall near Thetford. He was a staunch monarchist, possibly due to his father's good relationship with Queen Victoria, even hanging a portrait of republican Oliver Cromwell upside-down in his lavatory at Blo' Norton. His collection of Jacobite and Stuart relics (and the Cromwell painting) were presented to Inverness Museum. He gave to the town of Thetford the timber-framed Ancient House (now a museum) together with his collection of portraits.

=== Military ===
Prince Frederick served with Yeomanry regiments from 1893 to 1919.

- Appointed Second Lieutenant: – Suffolk Imperial Yeomanry – 12 August 1893.
- Promoted Lieutenant: 21 July 1894.
- Promoted Captain: 19 August 1898.

In March 1900 he was appointed Assistant Adjutant to the 7th Yeomanry Brigade, and made a supernumerary officer in his own regiment. In July 1901, Prince Frederick transferred to the Norfolk Yeomanry from the Suffolk Yeomanry and was promoted to the rank of major. He resigned his commission in 1909 but rejoined the Norfolk Yeomanry in 1914 at the outbreak of World War I and was on active service in France for two years and with the General Staff.

== Honours ==
=== British ===
- United Kingdom: Member of the Royal Victorian Order, 1901
- United Kingdom: Recipient of the Territorial Decoration
- United Kingdom: Recipient of the 1914 Star Medal
- United Kingdom: Recipient of the Victory Medal
- United Kingdom: Recipient of the King Edward VII Coronation Medal
- United Kingdom: Recipient of the King George V Coronation Medal

== Ancestry ==
Ancestors of Frederick Duleep Singh

Budha Singh
Naudh Singh
Charat Singh
8. Sardar Maha Singh
4. Maharaja Ranjit Singh of Punjab
9. Raj Kaur
2. Maharaja Duleep Singh of Punjab
10. Manna Singh
5. Jind Kaur
1. Crown Prince Frederick Duleep Singh
6. Ludwig Müller
3. Bamba Müller
7. Sofia
