= Irene Duleep Singh =

Anglo-Indian princess

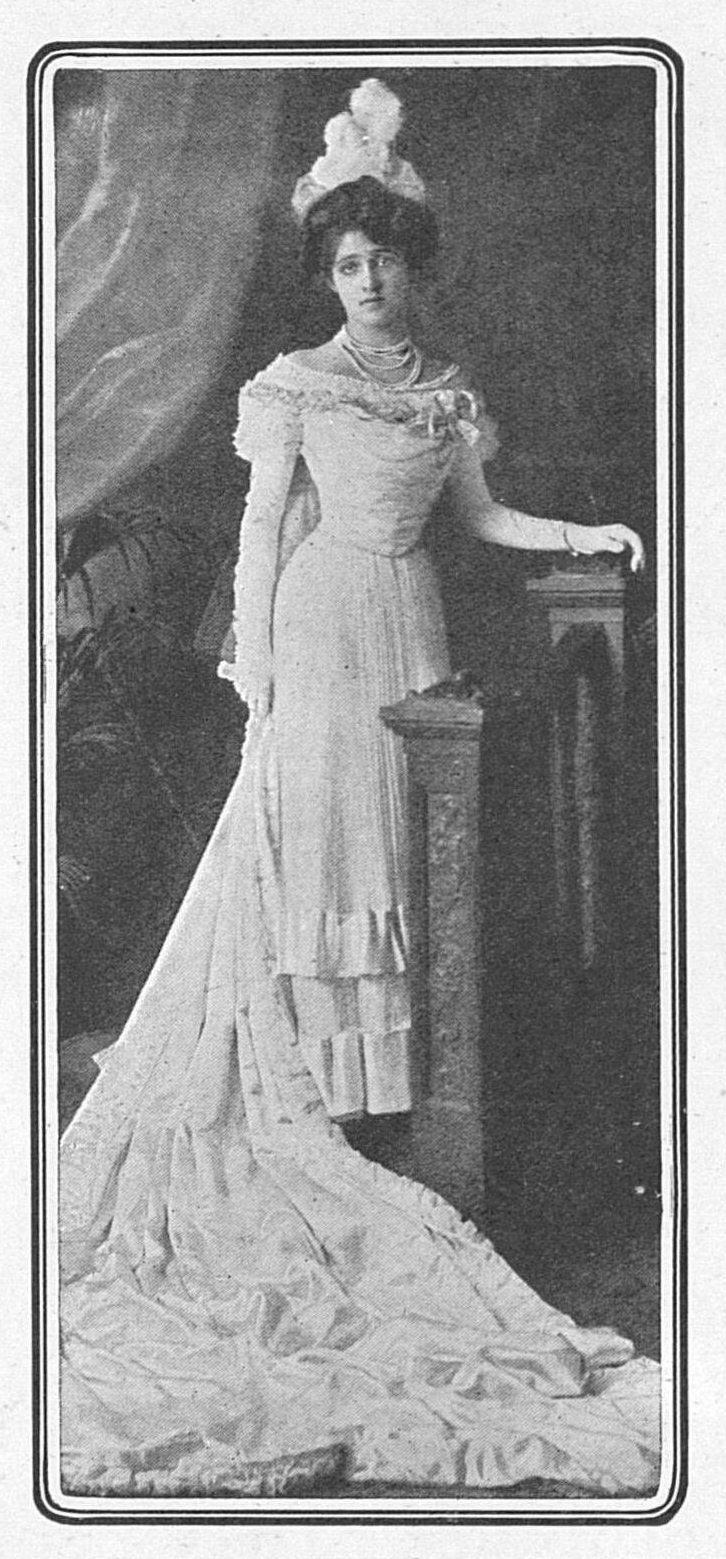
- Wedding-photograph of Princess Irene Duleep Singh, published in The Sketch (Wednesday, 30 March 1910)
- Born: 25 October 1889; Paris, France
- Died: 8 October 1926 (aged 36); Monte Carlo, Monaco
Names
- Princess Ada Irene Helen Benyl Duleep Singh

Irene Duleep Singh (25 October 1889 – 8 October 1926) was an Anglo-Indian princess and painter who was the daughter of Maharaja Duleep Singh and his second wife, Ada Wetherill, an Englishwoman. Compared to her more famous half-sisters from Duleep Singh's first marriage, comparatively little is known about Princess Irene and her sister Pauline. She suffered from mental-illness and lost her life to suicide. After her death, her estate was contested between her surviving sister Pauline and her half-sister Bamba, which permanently damaged relations between them.

== Biography ==
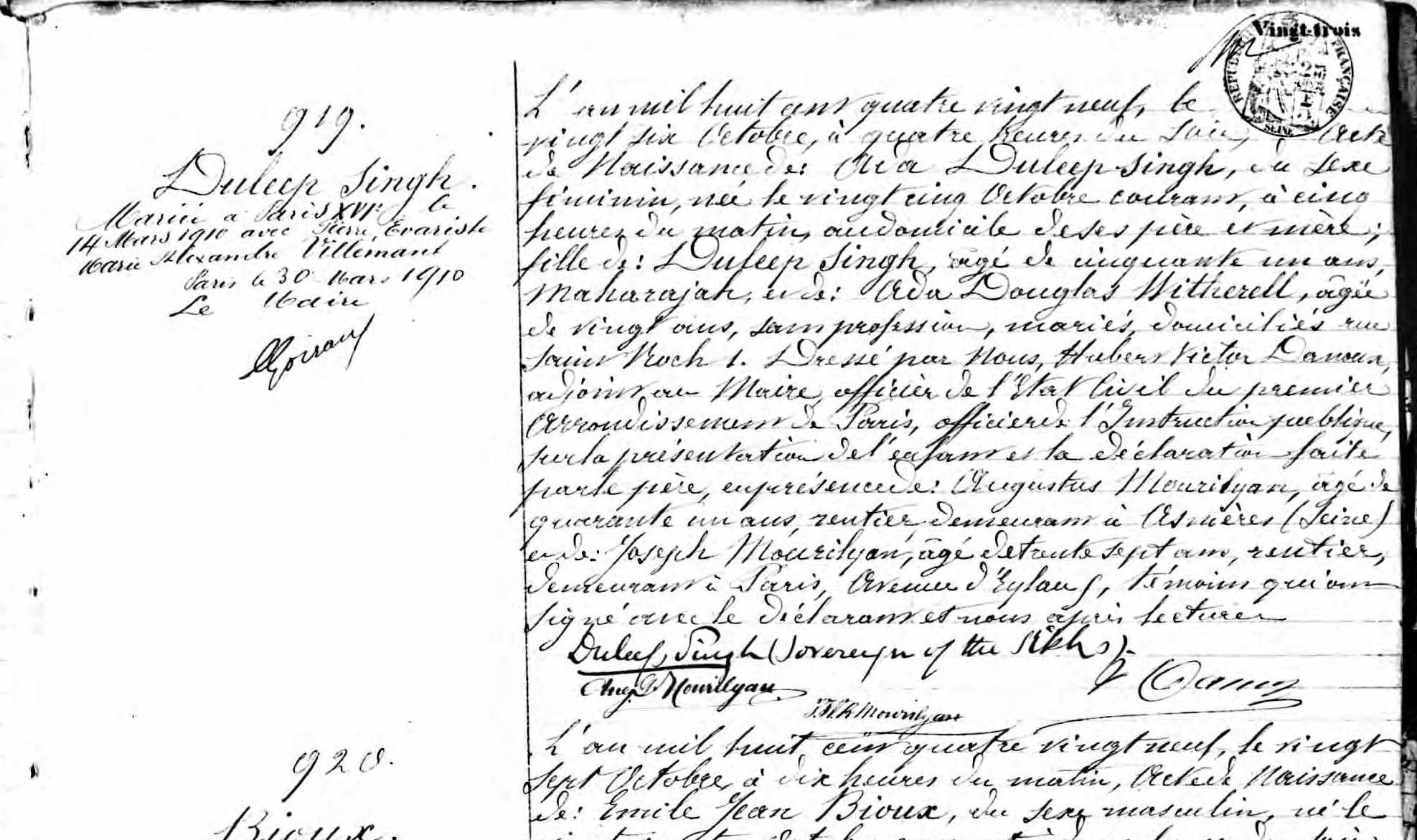
Birth record for Princess Irene Duleep Singh, Paris, France, 27 October 1889.

Irene was born on 25 October 1889 in Paris, France to parents Maharaja Duleep Singh and Ada Douglas-Wetherill. She was the second daughter born to the couple. On 15 March 1910, she married a Frenchman named Pierre Marie Villament. She suffered from mental illness, with a Nice correspondent of the Petit Pariser reporting that she was a neurasthenic. In 1924, she received "treatment" (at the time, treatment for her disorder involved electric-shock therapy) for her mental illness in England at nursing-home after admitting herself but moved back to Paris after her care there. After coming back to Paris, she moved into an apartment on Avenue Hoche and she began painting and started socializing. However, she was far away from her family and the Parisian environment reminded her of her difficult childhood years, which made her mental state worsen again.

=== Divorce and suicide ===
In August 1925, she and her husband separated, which resulted in her attempting to commit suicide by jumping out of a window, which injured her. This suicide attempt was published in the French press, drawing negative attention to her, worsened her state, becoming reclusive and estranged even from her full-sister Pauline. According to Anita Anand, Irene had suffered from depression, anxiety, and mood-swings her entire life (with epileptic fits being recorded in 1915) and her separation from her husband is what pushed her over the edge. Irene was reported to have scratched at herself to get the "black blood" out and suffered from delusions, such as believing she had two children who had been stolen from her, or that she was turning into a wild animal. She also starved herself, removed her fingernails, and pulled-out her hair. In August 1926, her half-brother Prince Frederick Duleep Singh died, which affected her and put her in a state of mourning. On 8 October 1926, her body was discovered in Monte Carlo, Monaco by a fisherman in the waters off the Riviera after she committed suicide by drowning. A suicide-note was found, where she stated that she was "tired of life".

Nobody will ever hear of me again, as I am going to commit suicide this afternoon... I am home-less... my nerves have prevented me continuing my studies, but I have grasped my object... I have been staying a week at Monte Carlo but here I only play the fool and lose my pocket-money... Please forgive me for troubling you in such troublesome times, but it is the last time.

— Irene Duleep Singh, final letter to her friend and lawyer Lancelot Smith, published in 'Sophia: Princess, Suffragette, Revolutionary' (Anita Anand, 2015, page 351)

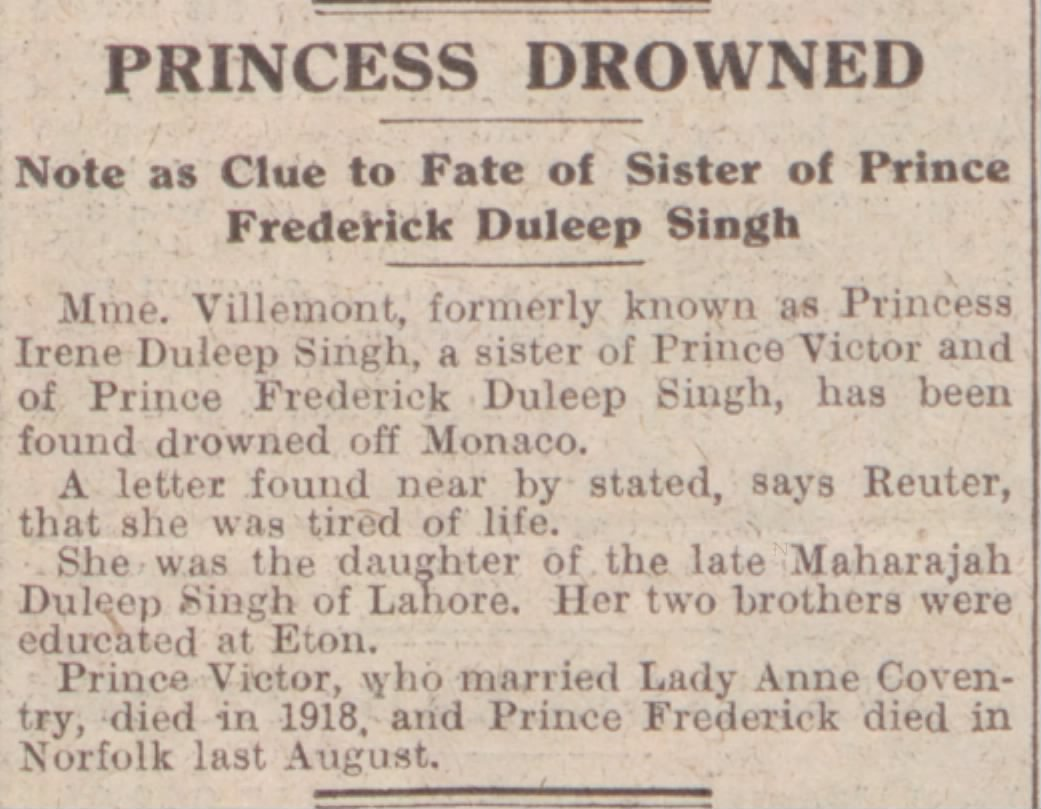
Obituary of Princess Irene Duleep Singh, published in the Daily Mirror (Friday, 15 October 1926)

Irene was buried at Monaco Cemetery.

== Legal dispute over her inheritance ==
After her death, her inheritance (estate worth over £20,000–30,000) was contested between her surviving sister Pauline and her half-sister Bamba, which permanently strained their relations there-after. Originally, Irene had bequeathed her inheritance to her sister, Pauline. However, one day prior to her suicide she had instead gotten a new will made that gave all her inheritance to a charity named Dr Barnardo's Home for Poor and Unwanted Children. Pauline contested the new will on the basis of her sister not having a sound state of mind at the time. However, for unknown reasons, Princess Bamba also contested the will and claimed to be its true beneficiary and tried to destroy the reputation of her half-sister Pauline, however Catherine and Sophia did not join her legal battle and separated themselves from the affair. Bamba hired Sir Ellis Hume-Williams as a lawyer and had private medical-records of the late Irene revealed. The court ruled entirely in-favour of Irene's surviving sister Pauline and Bamba was ordered to pay the £3,600 legal fees for both the plaintiff and defendant. However, Bamba never paid the cost. The relationship between Pauline and her half-sisters never recovered after the legal case and she moved to France.

== Ancestry ==
Ancestors of Irene Duleep Singh

Budha Singh
Naudh Singh
Charat Singh
8. Maha Singh
4. Ranjit Singh
9. Raj Kaur
2. Duleep Singh
10. Manna Singh
5. Jind Kaur
1. Princess Irene Duleep Singh
3. Ada Douglas-Wetherill
