= Victor Duleep Singh =

- Crown Prince of Punjab
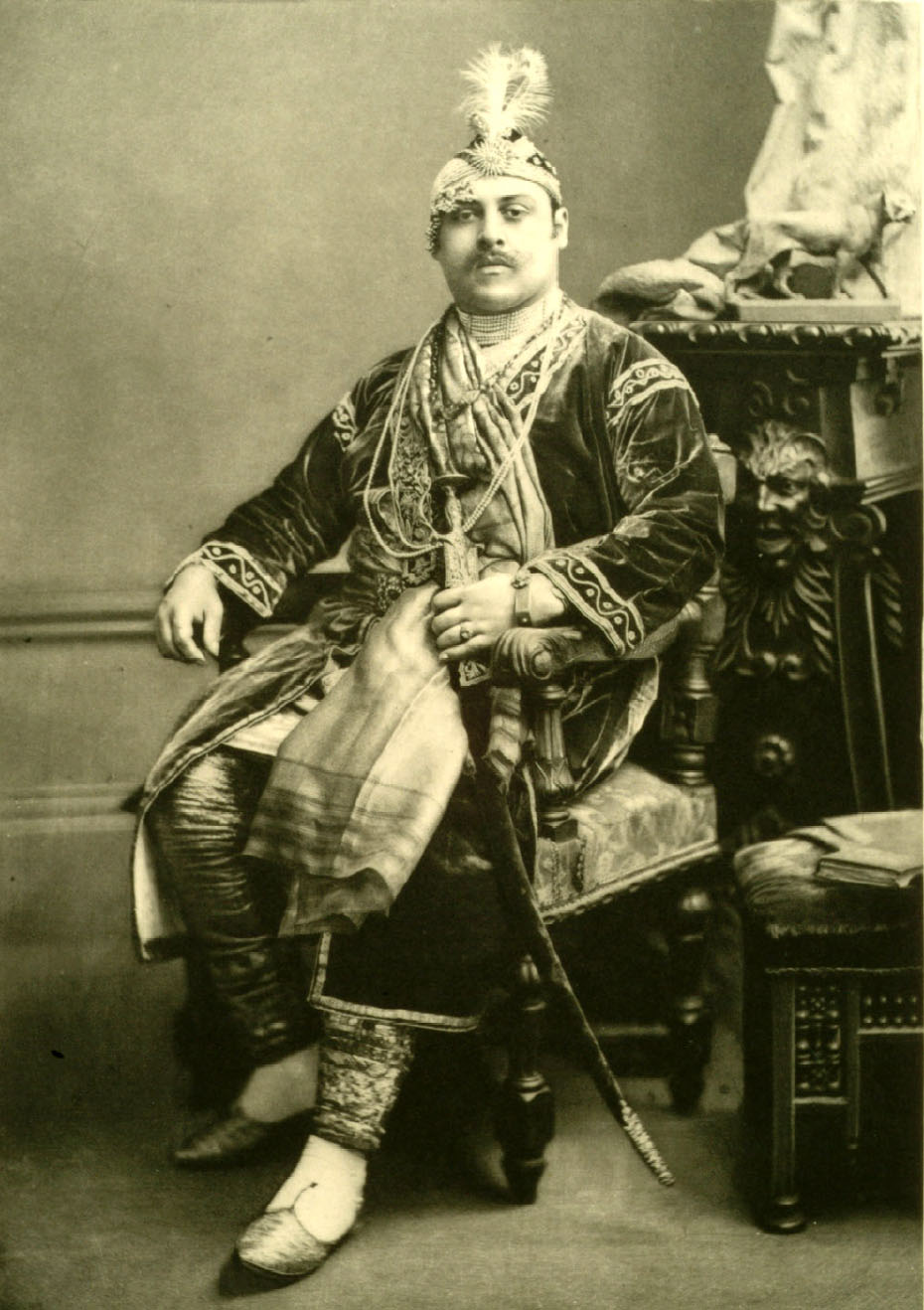
- Photograph of Victor as Emperor Akbar of India taken at the Devonshire House Ball by Alexander Bassano in 1897.

Head of the Royal House of Punjab
- Period: 22 October 1893 – 7 June 1918
- Predecessor: Duleep Singh
- Successor: Frederick Duleep Singh
- Born: Victor Albert Jay Duleep Singh; 10 July 1866; London, England, United Kingdom
- Died: 7 July 1918 (aged 51); Monte Carlo, Monaco
- Spouse: Lady Anne Coventry (m. 1898)
- House: Sukerchakia
- Father: Duleep Singh
- Mother: Bamba Müller

Prince Victor Albert Jay Duleep Singh (10 July 1866 – 7 June 1918) was the eldest son of Maharani Bamba Müller and Maharaja Sir Duleep Singh, the last Maharaja of Lahore, and of the Sikh Empire, and the grandson of Maharaja Ranjit Singh.

== Biography ==
Victor Duleep Singh was educated at Eton and Trinity College, Cambridge, where he met Lady Anne Blanche Alice Coventry whom he would later marry. In 1887 he entered the Royal Military College, Sandhurst, with a special Cadetship and left it the following December to be commissioned as Lieutenant into the 1st (Royal) Dragoons.

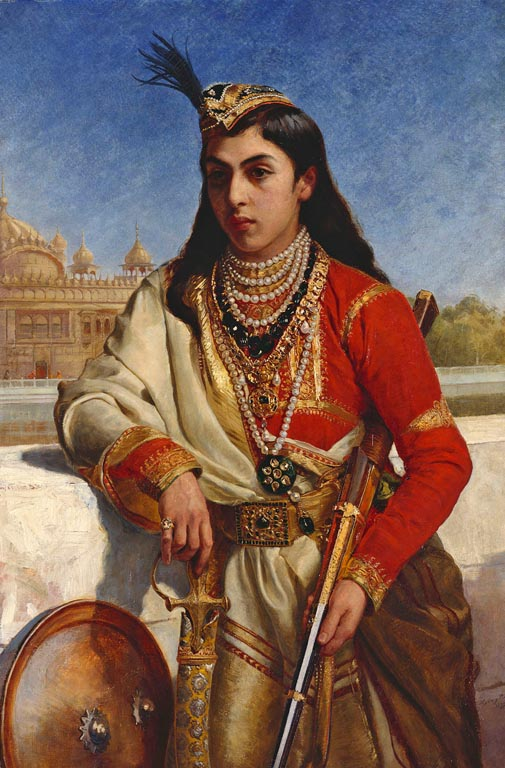
Prince Victor's portrait oil on canvas by Sydney Prior Hall made in 1879 now a part of the Royal Collection.

In 1889 Singh was stationed at Halifax, Nova Scotia, as a member of the staff of General Sir John Ross, commander of British forces in British North America. In December, he was rumoured to be engaged to marry Jeanne Turnure, daughter of Lawrence Turnure, a New York City banker, after staying at the Turnure house in Newport, Rhode Island, the previous summer; the rumour was however denied by the banker. In February the following year, Singh took a three-month leave of absence from the army to meet his father in Paris, when rumours of unpaid creditors in Halifax became current for the first time. He continued to serve in the Royal Dragoons until he resigned his commission in 1898.

On the death of his father, Maharaja Sir Duleep Singh, on 23 October 1893, Victor succeeded him as titular head of the Royal House of the Punjab.

On 4 January 1898, Prince Victor Albert Jay Duleep Singh married Lady Anne Coventry, a daughter of the 9th Earl of Coventry, who was eight years younger than himself. The marriage created a sensation: it was the first time an Indian prince had married an English noblewoman, and the marriage was made possible primarily due to the intervention of the Prince of Wales (subsequently King Edward VII). The wedding took place at St Peter's Church, Eaton Square, London, where Queen Victoria was also represented. Although Queen Victoria gave the couple her blessing, she allegedly told Lady Anne to never have children with the Prince. The marriage remained childless.

Singh was declared bankrupt on 4 September 1902, with debts totaling £117,900 (approximately £16.4 million in today's value), despite his £8,250 annual allowance and his wife's income of £2,500. The bankruptcy was attributed to bad investments and to gambling, something that plagued him for the rest of his life.

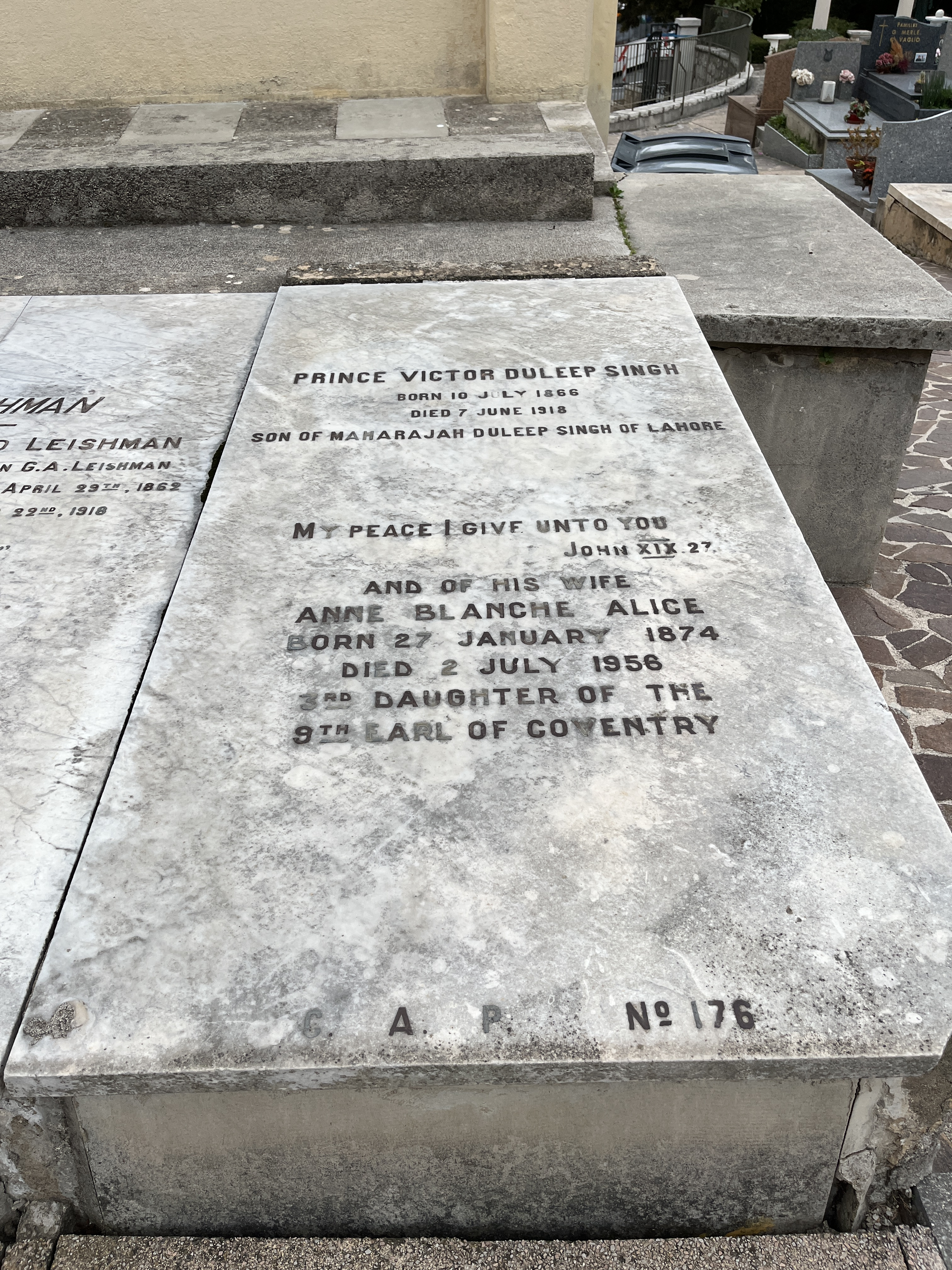
Grave of prince Victor Duleep Singh in Monaco cemetery

He died, without legitimate issue, aged 51, on 7 June 1918, and was buried at the Anglican Cemetery above Monte Carlo. Beside him is the grave of his wife who died aged 82, on 2 July 1956.

== Honours ==
=== National honours ===
- United Kingdom: Recipient of the King Edward VII Coronation Medal
- United Kingdom: Recipient of the King George V Coronation Medal

== Ancestry ==
Ancestors of Victor Duleep Singh

Budha Singh
Naudh Singh
16. Sardar Charat Singh
8. Sardar Maha Singh
4. High King Ranjit Singh of Punjab
9. Raj Kaur
2. High King Duleep Singh of Punjab
10. Manna Singh
5. Jind Kaur
1. Crown Prince Victor Duleep Singh
6. Ludwig Müller
3. Bamba Müller
7. Sofiá
