= Jind Kaur =

Maharani Jind Kaur
- Maharani of the Sikh Empire; Rajmata of the Sikh Empire
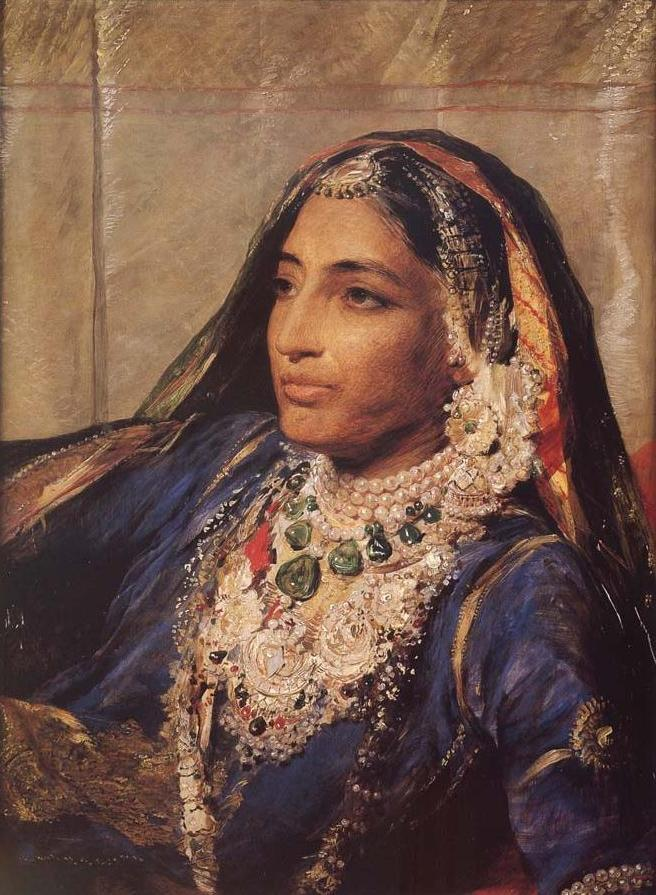
- Portrait by George Richmond, c. 1862

Maharani of the Sikh Empire
- Tenure: c. 1847 (nominal power)
- Predecessor: Duleep Singh (as Maharaja)
- Successor: Office abolished (Note: Sikh Empire annexed by East India Company)

Regent of the Sikh Empire
- Regency: c. 1843 – c. 1847
- Monarch: Duleep Singh
- Born: 1817; Chichrianwali, Gujranwala, Sikh Empire
- Died: 1 August 1863 (aged 45); Kensington, Middlesex, United Kingdom
- Spouse: Maharaja Ranjit Singh (m. 1829; died 1839)
- Issue: Maharaja Duleep Singh
- House: Sukerchakia (by marriage)
- Father: Manna Singh Aulakh
- Religion: Sikhism

Maharani Jind Kaur (c. 1817 – 1 August 1863), also known as Rani Jindan Kaur, was regent and, shortly the regnant of the Sikh Empire from 1843 until 29 March 1847. After the Sikh Empire was dissolved on 29 March 1847, the Sikhs claimed her as the Maharani and successor of Maharaja Duleep Singh. However, on the same day the British took full control and refused to accept the claims.

She was the youngest of the wives of the first Maharaja of the Sikh Empire, Ranjit Singh, and the mother of the last Maharaja, Duleep Singh. She was renowned for her beauty, energy and strength of purpose and was popularly known as Rani Jindan, but her fame is derived chiefly from the fear she engendered in the British in India, who described her as "the Messalina of the Punjab".

After the assassinations of Ranjit Singh's first three successors, Duleep Singh came to power in September 1843 at the age of 5 and Jind Kaur became Regent on her son's behalf. After the Sikhs lost the First Anglo-Sikh War she was replaced in December 1846 by a Council of Regency, under the control of a British Resident. However, her power and influence continued and, to counter this, the British imprisoned and exiled her. Over thirteen years passed before she was again permitted to see her son, who was taken to England.

In January 1861 Duleep Singh was allowed to meet his mother in Calcutta and took her with him back to England, where she remained until her death in Kensington, London, on 1 August 1863 at the age of 46. She was temporarily buried in Kensal Green Cemetery and cremated the following year at Nashik, near Bombay. Her ashes were finally taken to the samadh (memorial) in Lahore of her husband, Maharaja Ranjit Singh, by her granddaughter, Princess Bamba Sofia Jindan Duleep Singh.

== Family ==
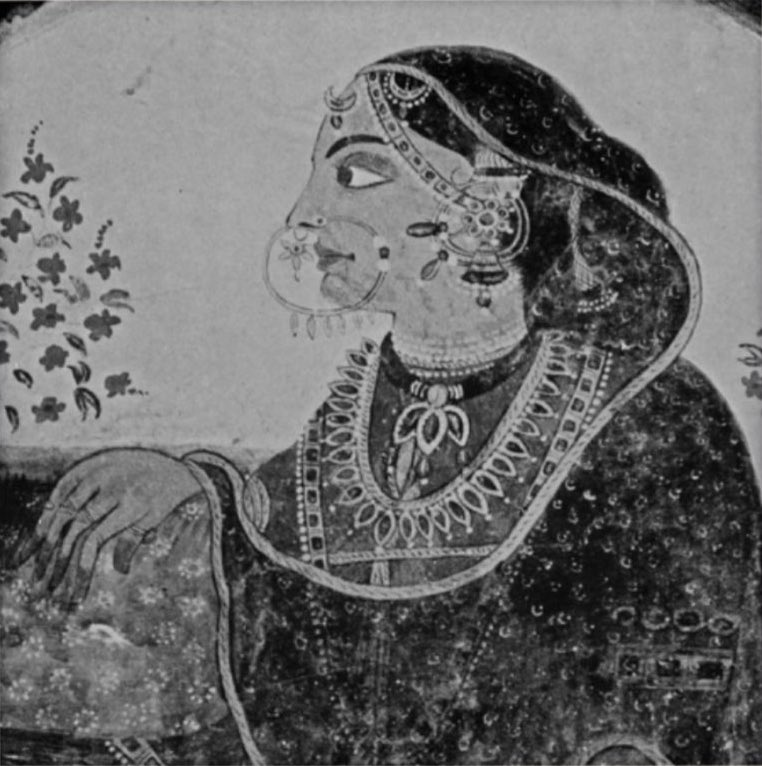
A wall painting of Maharani Jind Kaur from the old haveli of Sandhanwalia Sardars at Raja Sansi in Amritsar

Jind Kaur was born in Chachar, Gujranwala, the daughter of Manna Singh, into an Aulakh Jat family the overseer of the royal kennels. She had an elder brother, Jawahar Singh Aulakh and an elder sister, Aas Kaur, who married Sardar Jawala Singh Padhania, the Chief of Padhana in the Lahore District. Manna Singh extolled Jind Kaur's beauty and virtues to Maharaja Ranjit Singh, who summoned and married her in 1835 by sending his 'arrow and sword' to the village. On 6 September 1838 she gave birth to her only child, Duleep Singh.

On 7 June 1864 Duleep Singh married Bamba Müller, daughter of Ludwig and Sofia Müller, by whom he had four sons, one of whom died in infancy, and three daughters. After the death of his first wife he married Ada Wetherill, daughter of Charles and Sarah Wetherill, and had two more daughters. All his children died without issue. Sophia Alexandra Duleep Singh, Duleep Singh's daughter from his first marriage, was active in the suffragette movement in the United Kingdom.

== Regency ==
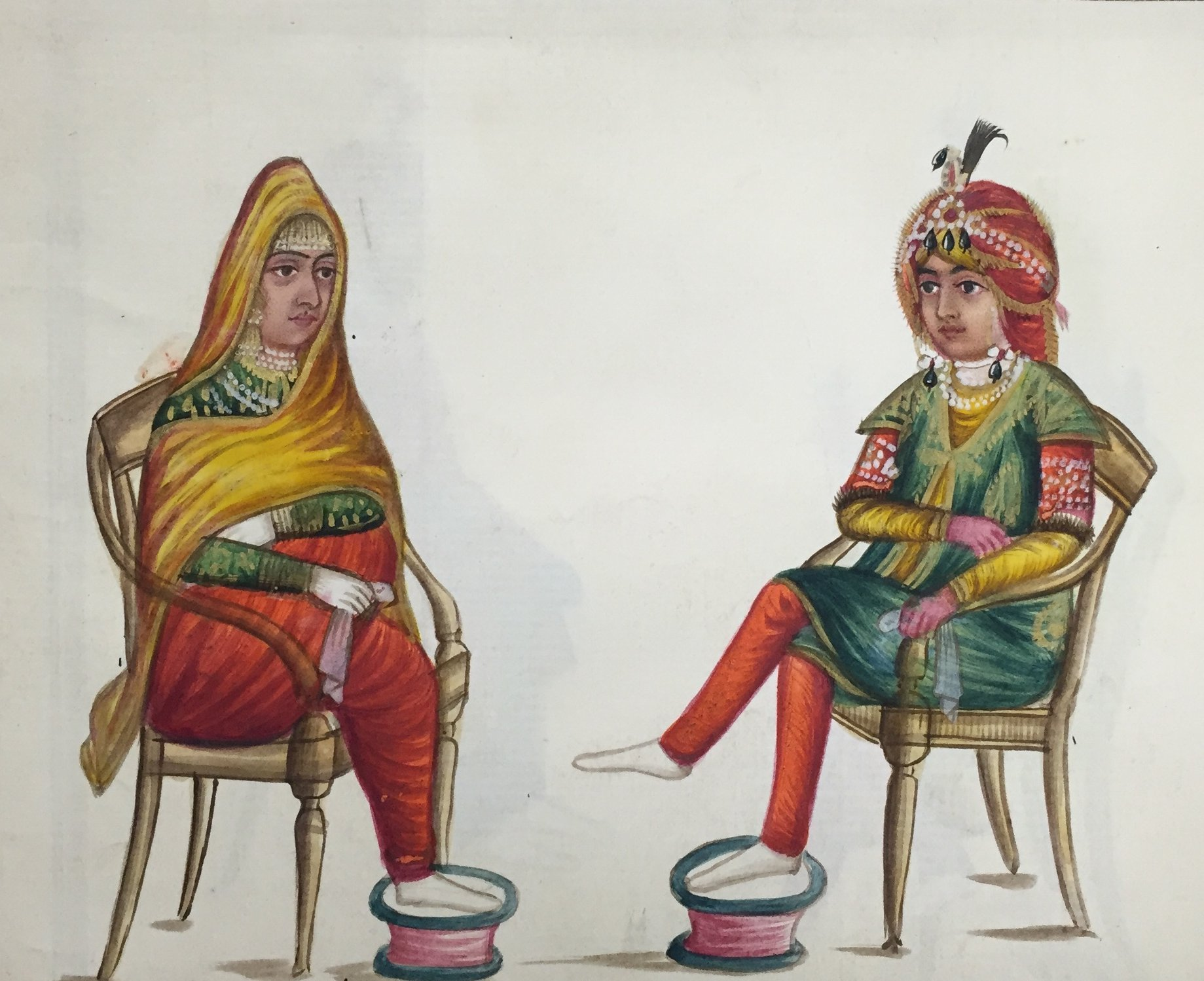
Jind Kaur with her son, Duleep Singh

After the death of Ranjit Singh, Jind Kaur and her son lived in relative obscurity under the care of Raja Dhian Siṅgh at Jammu that was governed by his brother Gulab Singh. On 16 September 1843, after the assassination of Maharaja Sher Singh and his wazir (vizier), the army proclaimed the 5-year-old Duleep Singh as sovereign. At first the new wazir, Hira Singh, took little notice of the young Maharaja and his mother. Jind Kaur became fiercely defensive of the rights of her son and pleaded with the regimental committees to protect his position asking 'who is the real sovereign, Duleep Singh or Hira Singh? If the former, then the Khālsā should ensure that he was not a king with an empty title.' The council supported her and she gradually became the symbol of sovereignty. She took control of the government with the approval of the army and cast off her veil. As Regent, she reconstituted the Supreme Council of the Khalsa and restored a balance between the army and the civil administration. She held court, transacted State business in public and reviewed and addressed the troops.

The young Maharani was faced with many problems. Pashaura Singh Kanvar, half brother of Duleep Singh, was seeking to replace Duleep Singh as Maharaja. The feudal chiefs wanted a reduction in the taxation imposed on them by Hira Singh and the restoration of their jagirs, land grants from which they received income. The army wanted an increase in pay. The cost of the civil and military administration had increased and Gulab Singh Dogra, Raja of Jammu and uncle of Hira Singh, had taken most of the Lahore Treasury. The power struggle between the various Sikh factions was continuing and some were secretly negotiating with the British East India Company forces amassing on the border.

In tackling these problems, the Maharani had the advice and support of the newly appointed council of elder statesmen and military leaders. To strengthen her power base, Jind Kaur betrothed Duleep Singh to the daughter of Chattar Singh Attariwalla, the Governor of Hazara province and a powerful and influential member of the Sikh nobility. Army pay was increased. Gulab Singh was brought to Lahore to face charges of treachery and his nephew, Hira Singh, was replaced as wazir by Jawahar Singh. Gulab Singh was allowed to return to Jammu after paying a fine of 6,800,000 rupees (68 lakh) and promising future good behaviour.

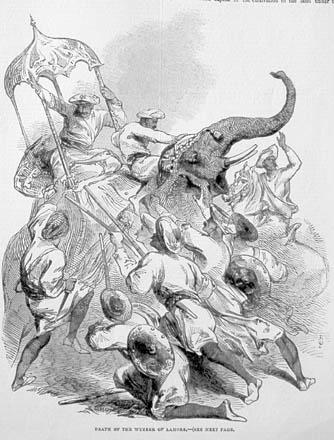
The killing of Jawahar Singh on 21 September 1845, as portrayed in the Illustrated London News

Pashaura Singh arrived in Lahore in January 1845. He was received with honour but was persuaded to return to his estates by the army and with the promise of an increase in his jagir. However, in July he took the fort at Attock and declared himself the ruler of the Punjab. A force commanded by Chatar Singh besieged the fort and forced him to surrender on the promise of a safe conduct. However Jawahar had decided that Pashaura posed too great a risk to the young Maharaja and he was secretly taken back to Attock and strangled. For his involvement in this, Jawahar Singh was stabbed to death in front of his sister, the agonised Maharani.

On 13 December 1845 the British Governor-General, Sir Henry Hardinge, issued a proclamation declaring war on the Sikhs. The causes and conduct of the First Anglo-Sikh War are described fully elsewhere. The Sikhs lost the war, due, they claimed, to the treachery of their commander-in-chief, Lal Singh and Tej Singh, who failed to attack when the British were at his mercy during the battle of Ferozeshah and later sank the Sikh bridge of boats in the battle of Sobraon. The terms of the Treaty of Lahore, signed in March 1846, were punitive but the seven-year-old Duleep Singh remained as Maharaja and Jind Kaur was to remain as regent. However, in December, she was replaced by a Council of Regency, controlled by a British Resident, and awarded an annual pension of 150,000 rupees.

== Imprisonment ==
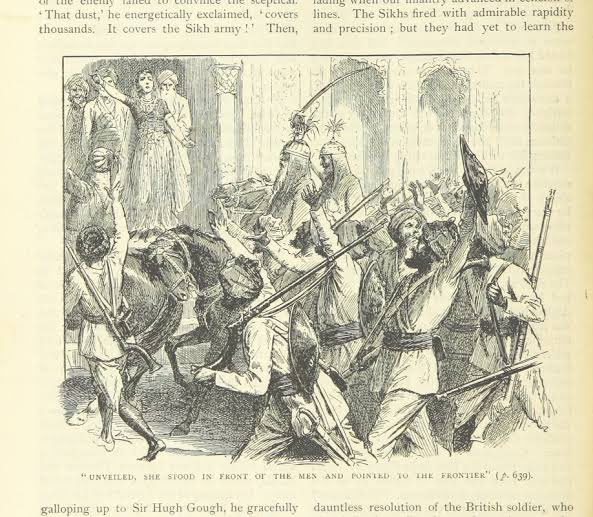
Drawing of Maharani Jind Kaur rallying the Sikh troops

After the war the British rewarded the leaders who had helped them, including Lal Singh and Tej Singh. However, the Sikh commanders were seething at what they saw as his treachery. When in August 1847 Duleep Singh refused to invest Tej Singh as Raja of Sialkot, the British Resident, Henry Lawrence, imprisoned the Maharani in the Samman Tower of the Lahore Fort and, ten days later, moved her to the fortress in Sheikhupura and reduced her pension to 48,000 rupees. The bitterest blow to the Maharani was the separation from her 9-year-old son. She wrote to Lawrence imploring him to return Duleep to her. "He has no sister, no brother. He has no uncle, senior or junior. His father he has lost. To whose care has he been entrusted?" She did not see her son again for thirteen and a half years.

The following year, the new British Resident, Sir Frederick Currie, described her as "the rallying point of rebellion" and exiled her from Punjab. She was taken to the Chunar Fort, about 45 km from Varanasi, and her jewellery was taken from her. Her treatment by the two Residents caused deep resentment among Sikhs. The Muslim ruler of neighbouring Afghanistan, Dost Mohammad Khan, protested that such treatment is objectionable to all creeds.

A year later she escaped from the Chunar Fort, disguised as a servant, and travelled through 800 km of forest to ask for sanctuary in Nepal. She arrived at Kathmandu in April 1849.

== Exile in Nepal ==
The mid-19th century was a time of great political upheaval in the Indian subcontinent with expanding British power. Noting a common adversary in the British, Nepal's Prime Minister Bhimsen Thapa and Maharaja Ranjit Singh forged a secret alliance against the British East India Company. However, Maharaja Ranjit Singh died suddenly in 1839 and the Sikh Empire started to disintegrate.

Rani Jind Kaur became the regent in 1843, as her son King Duleep Singh was still an infant. Led by her, Punjab went to war with the British in 1845. Lahore sought help from Kathmandu, but the Nepalese court in Kathmandu was divided and King, Rajendra Bikram Shah did not respond positively. Jind Kaur was exiled from the Punjab in July 1848, with her annual pension being continuously reduced to 48,000 rupees and then 12,000 rupees, with all her possessions, such as jewellery, being taken from her before she was sent to Benaras.

Following Punjab's annexation, the British imprisoned the Rani Jind Kaur in Chunar Fort near Varanasi. However on 18 April 1849, she managed to escape from the fort disguised as a maid and traveled 800 km north to reach Kathmandu. Initially, she stayed at the residence of Amar Bikram Shah, son of General Pushkar Shah, who had briefly served as Prime Minister of Nepal (1838–1839). Amar Bikram Shah's residence in the Narayanhiti area provided her with the facilities and dignity offered to royalty. But whenever outsiders came, she would disguise herself and was introduced as a “maid from Hindustan.” Rani Jind Kaur had chosen to stay at Amar Bikram Shah's residence because General Pushkar Shah was one of the key officials engaged in forging an alliance between Nepal and Punjab against the British when Maharaja Ranjit Singh was alive. She stayed in Amar Bikram Shah's house for a few months before she decided to come out of her hiding and approach the then Prime Minister of Nepal, Jung Bahadur Rana.

The Rani Jind Kaur was given refuge by the then Prime Minister of Nepal, Jung Bahadur Rana, and was treated with full dignity as a Queen consort of Maharaja Ranjit Singh. A brand new residence, Charburja Durbar, was built within the Thapathali Durbar complex and an allowance was set by the Nepalese government. The British Resident in Kathmandu kept an eye on her, believing that she was still intriguing to revive the Sikh dynasty. She lived in Nepal for 11 years. But she eventually became disillusioned and realized the Nepalis would not help her in her mission of restoring the Sikh state, so she eventually left for England to be reunited with her son.

== Reunion and final years ==
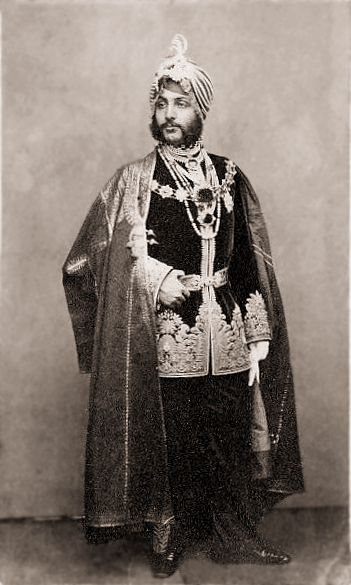
Duleep Singh, 1861

In November 1856 Jung Bahadur Rana sent the Governor-General of India a letter which he had intercepted from Duleep Singh to Jind Kaur, suggesting that she come to England. The letter was dismissed as a forgery. However, shortly afterwards Duleep Singh commissioned Pundit Nehemiah Goreh to visit Kathmandu on his behalf and find out how his mother was managing. This attempt was also doomed to failure and the Pundit was forbidden to contact the Maharani. Duleep Singh then decided to go himself, using the pretext of a tiger shoot in Bengal. In 1860 he wrote to the British Resident in Kathmandu, enclosing his letter in one from Sir John Login so that it would not be intercepted or dismissed as a forgery. The Resident reported that the Rani had 'much changed, was blind and had lost much of the energy which formerly characterised her.' The British decided that she was no longer a threat and on 16 January 1861 she was permitted to join her son at Spence's Hotel, in Calcutta. At the time several Sikh regiments were returning home via Calcutta at the end of the Chinese war. The presence of Sikh royalty in the city gave rise to demonstrations of joy and loyalty. The hotel was surrounded by thousands of armed Sikhs and the Governor-General, Lord Canning, requested Duleep Singh, as a favour, to leave for England with his mother by the next boat.

During the passage to England, Duleep Singh wrote to Sir John Login, who had been his guardian throughout his adolescence in British hands, asking him to find a house for his mother near Lancaster Gate. Soon after her arrival, Lady Login visited with her three youngest children. She had heard tales of the Maharani's beauty and influence and strength of will and was curious to meet the woman who had wielded such power. Her compassion was aroused when she met a tired half-blind woman, her health broken and her beauty vanished. "Yet the moment she grew interested and excited in a subject, unexpected gleams and glimpses through the haze of indifference and the torpor of advancing age revealed the shrewd and plotting brain of her, who had once been known as the 'Messalina of the Punjab'."

While in India Duleep Singh had negotiated the return of the Maharani's jewellery, which had been kept in the treasury at Benares. These arrived at Lancaster Gate just before the Maharani returned Lady Login's visit, and her delight was so great that "she forthwith decorated herself, and her attendants, with an assortment of the most wonderful necklaces and earrings, strings of lovely pearls and emeralds", to wear during the visit. The portrait of the Maharani by George Richmond shows her wearing some of the jewels, including the emerald and pearl necklace, which was sold by auction on 8 October 2009 at Bonhams for £55,200.

For a while Duleep Singh moved with his mother to Mulgrave Castle in Yorkshire. Attempts were made to arrange a separate establishment for her on the estate, but she was determined not to be separated from her son again. In the last two years of her life she reminded the Maharaja of his Sikh heritage and told him of the empire that had once been his, sowing the seeds that twenty years later led him to research for weeks in the British Library and to petition Queen Victoria, hoping naïvely to remedy the injustice he had suffered. Jind Kaur eventually settled in Kensington.

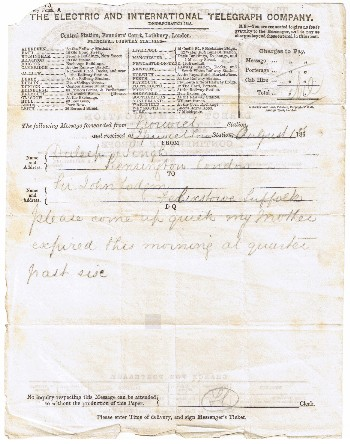
Telegram on Maharani Jind Kaur's death, sent by Duleep Singh to his guardian Sir John Login, 1863 [Peter Bance Collection]

On the morning of 1 August 1863 Maharani Jind Kaur died peacefully in her sleep in Abingdon House, Kensington. Her dying wish was: "Do not let my bones rot in this inhospitable country. Take me back to India". Cremation was illegal in Great Britain before 1885 and Duleep Singh was refused permission to take his mother's body to the Punjab, so it was kept for a while in the Dissenters' Chapel in Kensal Green Cemetery. In the spring of 1864 the Maharaja obtained permission to take the body to Bombay in India, where it was cremated, and he erected a small samadhi in memory of his mother on the Panchavati side of the Godavari River. Jind Kaur's wishes to be cremated in Lahore had been denied by British authorities. Her ashes were scattered in the Ganges river at Haridwar. The memorial in Bombay was maintained by the Kapurthala State authorities until 1924, when Princess Bamba Sutherland moved her remains and the memorial to the Samadhi of Ranjit Singh in Lahore. In 1997, a marble headstone with her name was uncovered during restorations at the Dissenters' Chapel in Kensal Green and in 2009 a memorial to the Maharani was installed at the site.

== Legacy ==
The samadhi of Jind Kaur was located in Lahore near the samadhis of her husband, Ranjit Singh. However, her samadhi has since been demolished and replaced with a recent construction. A photograph of Jind Kaur was taken by John McCosh but is now lost.

== Popular media ==
In 2010, The Rebel Queen, a docudrama short was released by Michael Singh and starred Indian actress Diana Pinto as the Maharani. In January 2020, Chitra Banerjee Divakaruni released The Last Queen a book inspired of her life. She is also a major character in George MacDonald Fraser's comic historical novel Flashman and the Mountain of Light.

Maharani Jind Kaur is also portrayed in The Black Prince by Shabana Azmi.

== See also ==
- Jung Bahadur Rana
- Charburja Durbar

== Bibliography ==
- The Encyclopedia of Sikhism, Harbans Singh, Editor-in-Chief, Punjabi University, 2002
- The Oxford Dictionary of National Biography, Oxford University Press, January 2012 edition
- B S Nijjar, Maharani Jind Kaur, Punjab Govt. Records
- Christy Campbell, The Maharajah's Box, Harper Collins, 2010, ISBN 9780730446415
- E Dalhousie Login, Lady Login's Recollections, Smith Elder, 1916
