= Naudh Singh =

Sikh warrior

Sardar of Sukerchakia Misl
- Reign: 1748–1752
- Predecessor: Position established
- Successor: Charat Singh
- Born: Gujranwala
- Died: 1752
- Spouse: Lali Kaur
- Issue: Charat Singh
- Dynasty: Sukerchakias
- Father: Budh Singh

Naudh Singh, also spelt as Nodh Singh (died 1752), was a Sikh leader and founder of the Sukerchakia Misl.

== Biography ==
Naudh Singh inherited a territory consisting of a few villages and surrounding areas paying rakhi tribute from his father, Budh Singh, after his father's death in 1718. Chaudhary Naudh Singh was the landlord of Gujranwala area that he renamed as Shukar Chak (meaning: "thanks for the land"). Naudh Singh fortified the village of Sukerchak and raised a jatha (militia) who came to be known as the Sukerchakias. The very beginning and earliest traces of the Sukerchakia Misl can be traced to Nodha Singh constructing a minor fortress in his native village of Sukerchak, along with gathering a small jatha of 30 horsemen to protect his locality from invading Afghans. He and his group of horsemen would later join the Faizalpuria Misl of Nawab Kapur Singh in 1730. He became wealthy by pillaging the caravans of the invading Afghans and established himself as the local chieftain of Sukerchak. During his time, the jatha joined forces with the militias of other misls against the Afghan forces of Ahmad Shah Abdali. When the Afghans withdrew, the Sukerchakias came to possess tracts of land between the Ravi and Jhelum rivers.

At the annual Diwali meeting of the Sarbat Khalsa in Amritsar in 1748, a Gurmata was passed that reorganized the various scattered and numerous jathas into eleven organized Misls, with the Sukerchakia Misl forming out of this judgement. (Note: It is unclear if the Sukerchakia Misl would have been established as an independent misl in 1748 after the passing of the Gurmata by the Sarbat Khalsa or if it was established a little later by Charat Singh's split from the Singhpuria Misl.)

=== Death ===
Nodh Singh died in 1752 in a skirmish after enemy soldiers set fire to a cave he was in. When Naudh died in 1752, he had four sons who survived him named Charat Singh, Dal Singh, Chet Singh, and Mangi Singh. He was succeeded by his son Charat Singh.

However, other sources state that he was severely wounded in 1747 during a fight with Afghans after being shot in the head.

== Notes ==
Preceded by none	Leader of the Sukerchakia Misl; 1752 –1770	Succeeded by Charat Singh
