= Grade II* listed buildings in Forest Heath =

There are over 20,000 Grade II* listed buildings in England. This page is a list of these buildings in the district of Forest Heath in Suffolk.

== Forest Heath ==
Name	Location	Type	Completed (Note: The date given is the date used by Historic England as significant for the initial building or that of an important part in the structure's description.)	Date designated	Grid ref. (Note: Sometimes known as OSGB36, the grid reference is based on the British national grid reference system used by the Ordnance Survey.) Geo-coordinates	Entry number (Note: The "List Entry Number" is a unique number assigned to each listed building and scheduled monument by Historic England.)	Image
Church of St Mary	Barton Mills, Forest Heath	Church	Medieval	7 May 1954	TL7168973819; 52°20′08″N 0°31′07″E	1351305	Church of St Mary More images
Paradise Farmhouse	Barton Mills	Farmhouse	c. 1500	7 May 1954	TL7232473847; 52°20′08″N 0°31′40″E	1037606	Upload Photo
Brandon Hall	Brandon	House	Late 17th century	7 May 1954	TL7704886166; 52°26′41″N 0°36′13″E	1351338	Upload Photo
Oak House	Brandon	House	c. 1730	7 May 1954	TL7838286767; 52°26′59″N 0°37′25″E	1193522	Upload Photo
Church of St Andrew	Cavenham	Church	Medieval	7 May 1954	TL7636069682; 52°17′49″N 0°35′05″E	1192820	Church of St Andrew More images
Lower Mill	Dalham	Smock Mill	c. 1790	7 May 1954	TL7198261665; 52°13′35″N 0°31′00″E	1037666	Lower Mill More images
Church of St Andrew and St Patrick	Elveden	Church	Medieval	7 May 1954	TL8228379942; 52°23′14″N 0°40′38″E	1192876	Church of St Andrew and St Patrick More images
Elveden Hall	Elveden Park, Elveden	Country House	c. 1760	27 January 1972	TL8246279720; 52°23′06″N 0°40′47″E	1037611	Elveden Hall More images
Water Tower, 200 Metres South West of Elveden Hall	Elveden Park, Elveden	Water Tower	1895	16 October 1984	TL8226279612; 52°23′03″N 0°40′36″E	1192866	Upload Photo
Church of St Laurence	Eriswell	Church	Medieval	7 May 1954	TL7236178019; 52°22′23″N 0°31′50″E	1037596	Church of St Laurence More images
Church of St Nicholas	Landwade, Exning	Church	c. 1445	19 August 1959	TL6232568098; 52°17′13″N 0°22′42″E	1162203	Church of St Nicholas More images
Glanelly Rest (Exning House) including two attached Gate Ways and Section of Garden Wall to North	Exning	Country House	1734	25 January 1963	TL6224465982; 52°16′05″N 0°22′34″E	1374829	Upload Photo
Church of St Andrew	Freckenham	Church	Medieval	7 May 1954	TL6659771758; 52°19′07″N 0°26′34″E	1037614	Church of St Andrew More images
Manor House	Freckenham	House	Late 17th century	16 October 1984	TL6674771807; 52°19′09″N 0°26′42″E	1037615	Upload Photo
Church of St Ethelbert	Herringswell	Church	Medieval	7 May 1954	TL7180669953; 52°18′03″N 0°31′06″E	1351310	Church of St Ethelbert More images
Church of St James	Icklingham	Church	Medieval	7 May 1954	TL7704873049; 52°19′37″N 0°35′48″E	1037582	Church of St James More images
Church of St Mary	Kentford	Church	Earlier	7 May 1954	TL7065466795; 52°16′22″N 0°29′59″E	1037677	Church of St Mary More images
Pack Horse Bridge over the River Kennet	Moulton	Packhorse Bridge	Early 15th century	7 May 1954	TL6975964531; 52°15′10″N 0°29′08″E	1037678	Pack Horse Bridge over the River Kennet More images
Church of St Agnes	Newmarket	Church	1886	26 June 1984	TL6501764006; 52°14′58″N 0°24′57″E	1037643	Church of St Agnes More images
Church of St Mary	Newmarket	Church	Medieval	28 November 1950	TL6412563419; 52°14′40″N 0°24′09″E	1037636	Church of St Mary More images
Cleveland House	Newmarket	House	c. 1730	10 March 1970	TL6483763476; 52°14′41″N 0°24′47″E	1351318	Upload Photo
Palace Mansion and Entrance Steps	Newmarket	House	Early to Mid 19th century	26 June 1984	TL6443363358; 52°14′38″N 0°24′25″E	1285676	Upload Photo
Church of St Denis	Wangford	Church	Medieval	7 May 1954	TL7508083513; 52°25′18″N 0°34′24″E	1037542	Church of St Denis More images
Elveden War Memorial	Elveden	War memorial	1921	7 May 1954	TL7880177624; 52°22′03″N 0°37′29″E	1037610	Elveden War Memorial More images
