= Lackford Hundred =

Former administrative division of Suffolk

Coordinates: 52.4°N 0.5°E

Lackford Hundred

Lackford was a hundred of Suffolk, consisting of 83,712 acres (338.77 km^{2}).

The hundred fills the north western corner of Suffolk and is triangular in shape, extending about fifteen miles (24 km) in length on each side. It is bounded on the north by Norfolk, on the west by Cambridgeshire, and on the south east by Blackbourn, Thingoe and Risbridge Hundreds. It is in the Franchise or Liberty of St Edmund, in the Diocese of Ely, the Archdeaconry of Sudbury and the Deanery of Fordham.

The main towns are Newmarket (detached from the rest of the hundred), Brandon and Mildenhall as well as a part of Thetford.

It is watered by the rivers Lark and Little Ouse, the latter of which separates it from Norfolk and the former after crossing it near Icklingham and Mildenhall flows northward and forms its western boundary with Cambridgeshire. The area to the north west of Mildenhall consists of low fen and part of the Bedford Level who drained the fens in the 17th century.

The name Lackford derives from the parish of the same name, Lackford just north-west of Bury St Edmunds, even though that village is actually in Thingoe Hundred. The village's name means "ford over the River Lark", referring to the ford on the village's border with Icklingham.

== Parishes ==
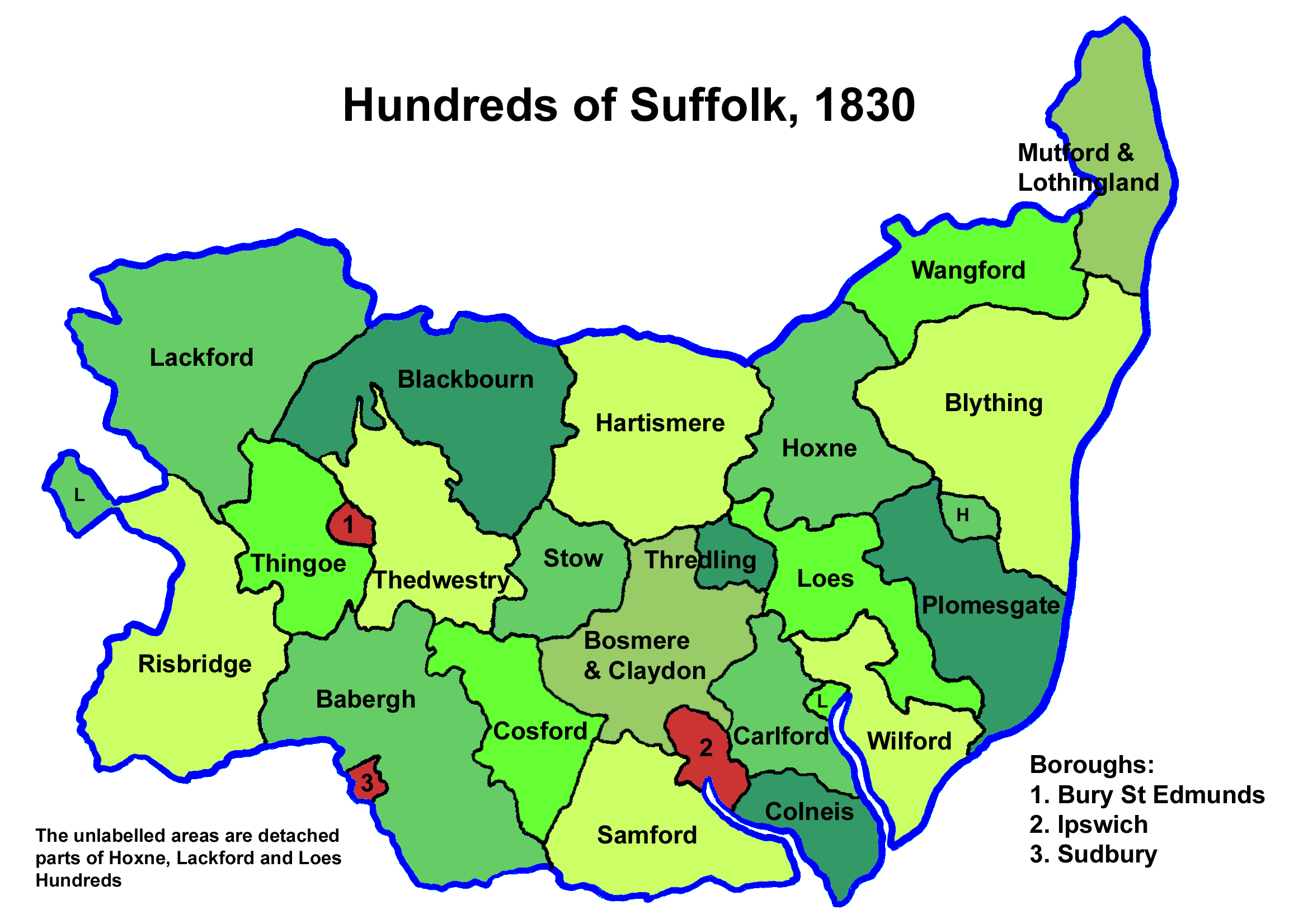
Suffolk hundreds

Lackford Hundred consisted of the following 17 parishes:

Parish	Area (acres)
Barton Mills	1827
Brandon	6760
Cavenham	2630
Elveden	5555
Eriswell	7000
Exning	5710
Freckenham	2520
Herringswell	2100
Icklingham	6580
Lakenheath	10550
Mildenhall	16000
Newmarket	250
Santon Downham	3860
Thetford St Mary	4480
Tuddenham	2435
Wangford	3500
Worlington	1955
