= Bamba Müller =

Last Maharani of Lahore (1848–1887)

Bamba
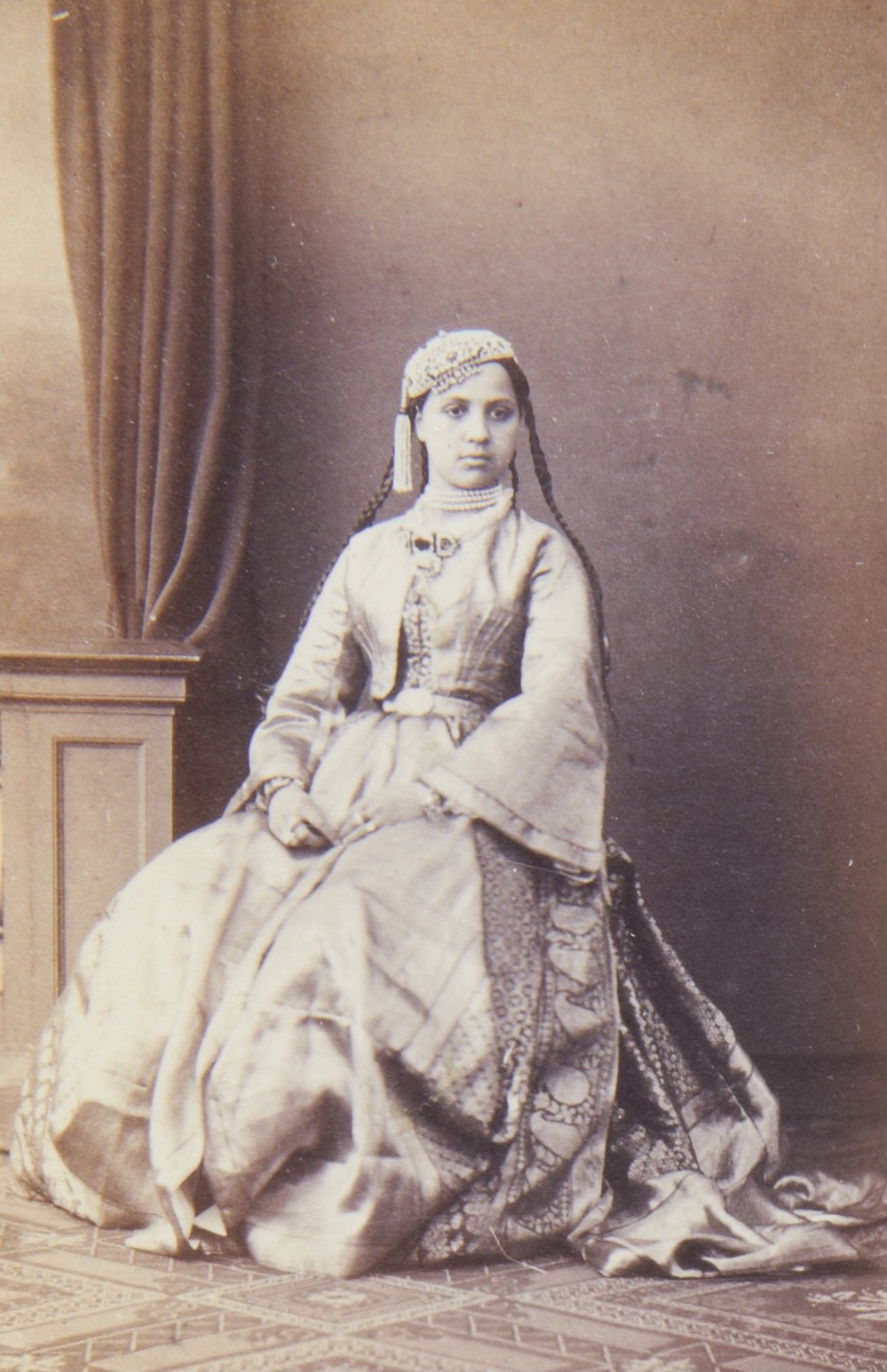
- Portrait by Antoine Claudet, c. 1864

Maharani of Lahore
- Tenure: 7 June 1864 – 16 September 1887
- Born: Bamba Müller; 6 July 1848; Cairo, Egypt Eyalet, Ottoman Empire
- Died: 16 September 1887 (aged 39)
- Burial: St Andrew and St Patrick Church, Elveden, Suffolk, England
- Spouse: Duleep Singh of Lahore (m. 1864)
- Issue: Crown Prince Victor Duleep Singh; Prince Frederick Duleep Singh; Princess Bamba Kaur; Princess Catherine Kaur; Princess Sophia Kaur; Prince Albert Duleep Singh
- Father: Ludwig Müller
- Mother: Sofia

Bamba Müller (6 July 1848 – 16 September 1887) was the wife of Maharaja Duleep Singh, the last Maharaja of Lahore. Brought up by Christian missionaries, her transformation from an illegitimate girl, born to a German father and Abyssinian (Ethiopian) mother, living in a Cairo mission to a Maharani living a life of luxury with the "Black Prince of Perthshire" has been compared to the "Cinderella" story.

== Early life ==
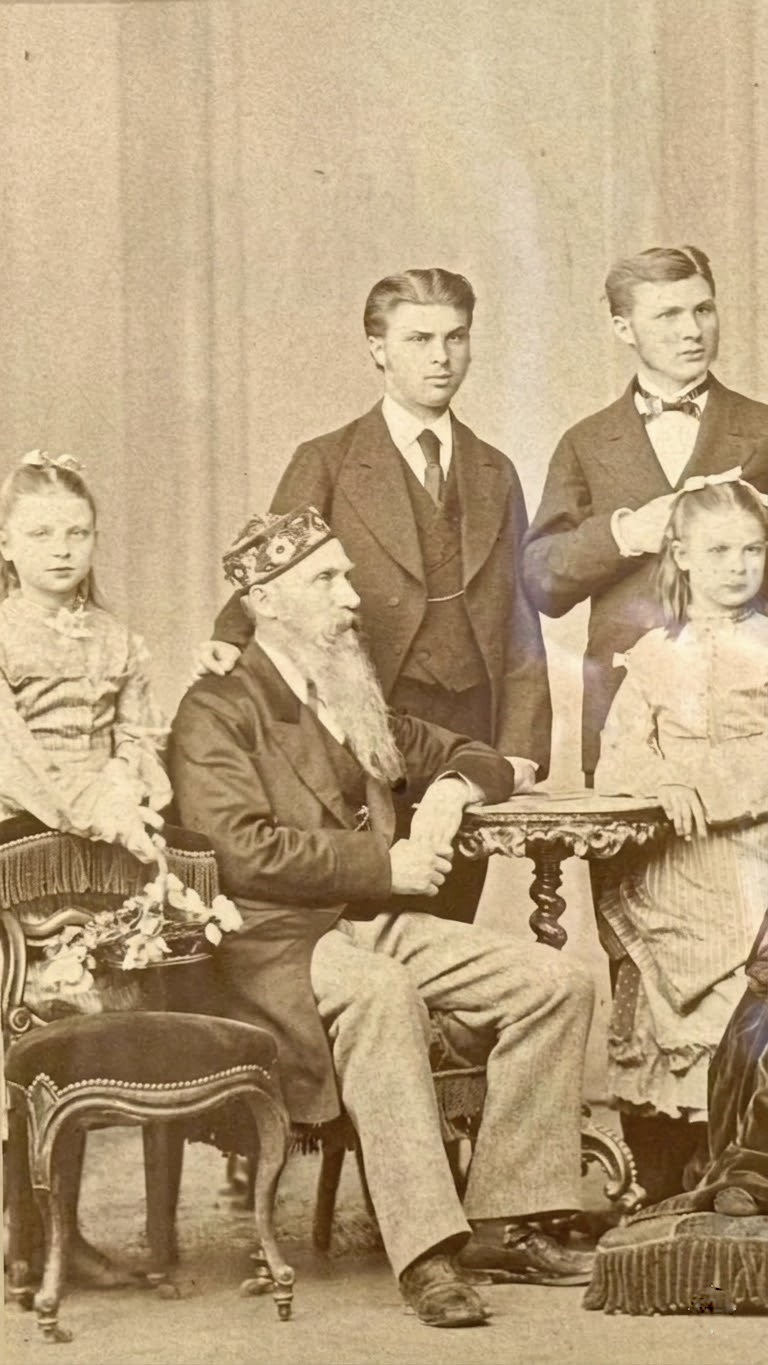
Photograph of the Müller family, Germany, circa late 19th century

Bamba Müller was the daughter of Ludwig Müller, a German merchant banker with the company Todd Müller and Co., by his mistress of Abyssinian descent called Sofia. The name Bamba was Arabic for pink. Her father already had a wife and he therefore placed his illegitimate daughter in the care of missionaries in Cairo. Her father had requested and paid for her education, and remained in contact with the missionaries. Müller became an enthusiastic and charismatic member of the Christian community and was the only female in a select group of communicants at the American Presbyterian Mission school in Cairo.

== The prince ==
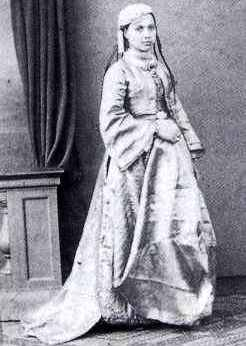
A young Bamba

Duleep Singh was the last ruler of the Sikh Empire, having been dethroned by the East India Company after the Second Anglo-Sikh War. In 1863, Singh was being supervised in Britain where he was a friend of Queen Victoria and kept a large social circle. He was known as the "Black Prince of Perthshire" around his home in Scotland. Singh was given money by the East India Company administration on the condition that he complied with the demands of the British government. Duleep had been taken to Britain when a child and raised as a Christian. This was after he had been persuaded to agree to the annexation of the Punjab by the East India Company. The treaty also included handing the Koh-i-Nor diamond as well, which became part of the Crown Jewels. Singh was separated from his mother, Maharani Jindan Kaur. His mother remained in India, although eventually she was allowed to rejoin her son in England. Duleep collected her after special permission was given. Duleep was allowed by the East India Company to visit India for the second time to bury his mother after she died in Britain, although the body remained at Kensal Green Cemetery for nearly a year whilst this was negotiated upon. His mother's ashes were not allowed to be buried in Lahore (the main city of the Punjab), but had to be placed in a memorial in Bombay instead.

== Proposal ==
On his return from Bombay Duleep passed through Cairo and visited the missionaries there on 10 February 1864. He visited again a few days later and was taken around the girls' school, where he first met Bamba Müller, who was an instructor. She was the only girl there who had committed herself to a Christian life. On each visit Duleep made presents to the mission of several hundreds of pounds.

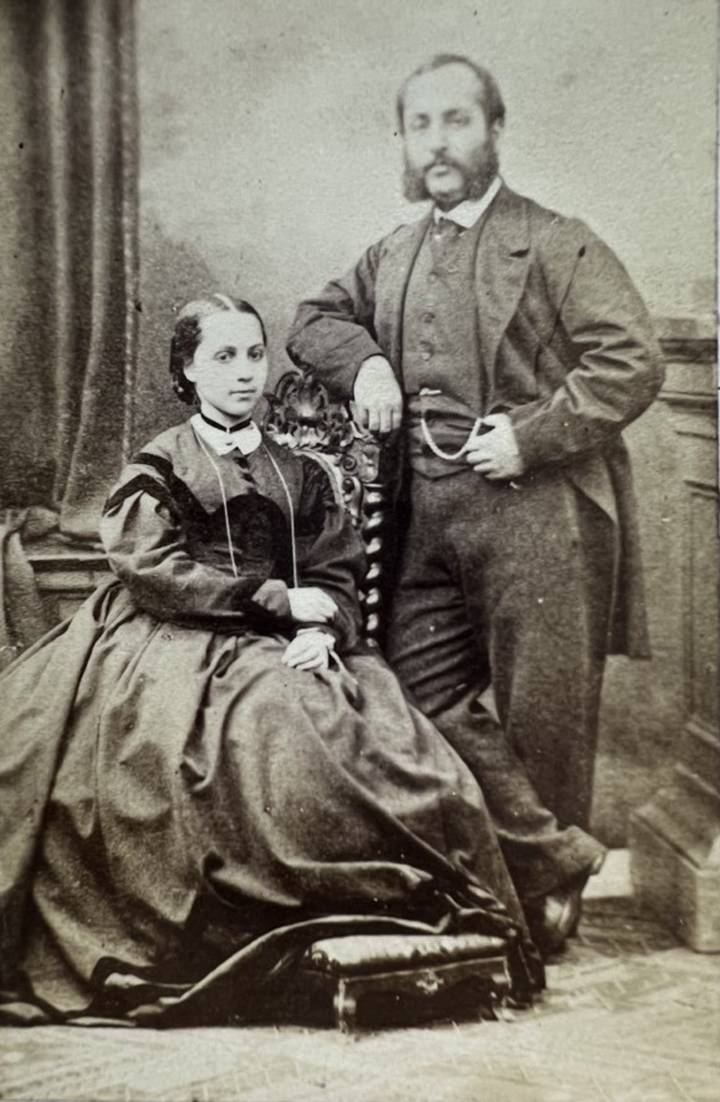
Photograph of Maharaja Duleep Singh and his wife Maharani Bamba Müller, ca.1868

Duleep Singh wrote to the teachers at the missionary school at the end of the month in the hope that they would recommend a wife for him as he was to live in Britain and he wanted a Christian wife of Eastern origin. Queen Victoria had told Duleep that he should marry an Indian princess who had been educated in England, but he desired a girl with less sophistication. The final proposal had to be done via an intermediary as Duleep did not speak Arabic, Müller's only language. The missionaries discussed this proposal with Müller. She was unsure whether to accept the proposal offered via the missionaries. Her first ambition was to rise to teach children in a missionary school. Her father was consulted but he left the choice to his daughter. Müller eventually made her decision after praying for guidance. She decided that the marriage was God's call for her to widen her ambitions. Singh made a substantial contribution of one thousand pounds to the school and married Müller on 7 June 1864 in the British Consulate in Alexandria, Egypt. The ceremony was described as brief, with few witnesses. Both of them wore European dress though Duleep wore a turban. Bamba wore simple jewellery including pearls. She had a short sleeved, moire, antique dress, orange blossoms in her hair, and a veil. The Prince made his vows in English, whilst Bamba spoke in Arabic.

== Family and death ==
The couple had three sons and three daughters whom they brought up at Elveden Hall in Suffolk, England. Their six children were: Victor Albert Jay (1866–1918), Frederick Victor (1868–1926), Bamba Sophia Jindan (1869–1957), Catherina Hilda (1871–1942), Sophia Alexandra (1876–1948), and Albert Edward Alexander (1879–1893). Bamba had difficulty caring for her children.

Victor and Frederick both joined the British Army whilst Frederick became a Fellow of the Society of Antiquaries of London. One of her daughters, Bamba Sophia Jindan, returned to Lahore as the wife of a Dr David Waters Sutherland. She was known as Princess Bamba Sutherland.

In 1886 her husband resolved to return to India. On his way there he was arrested in Aden and forced to return to Europe. Bamba died on Friday 16 September 1887 and was buried at Elveden. The cause of death was reported to Queen Victoria as "renal complications following [a] chill".

Bamba's husband went on to marry again in 1889 to Ada Douglas-Wetherill and had two more children.

Her son Albert Edward Alexander Duleep Singh died aged thirteen in Hastings on 1 May 1893 and was buried next to his mother. When Bamba's husband died, his body was brought back to England and buried with his wife and son at Elveden.
