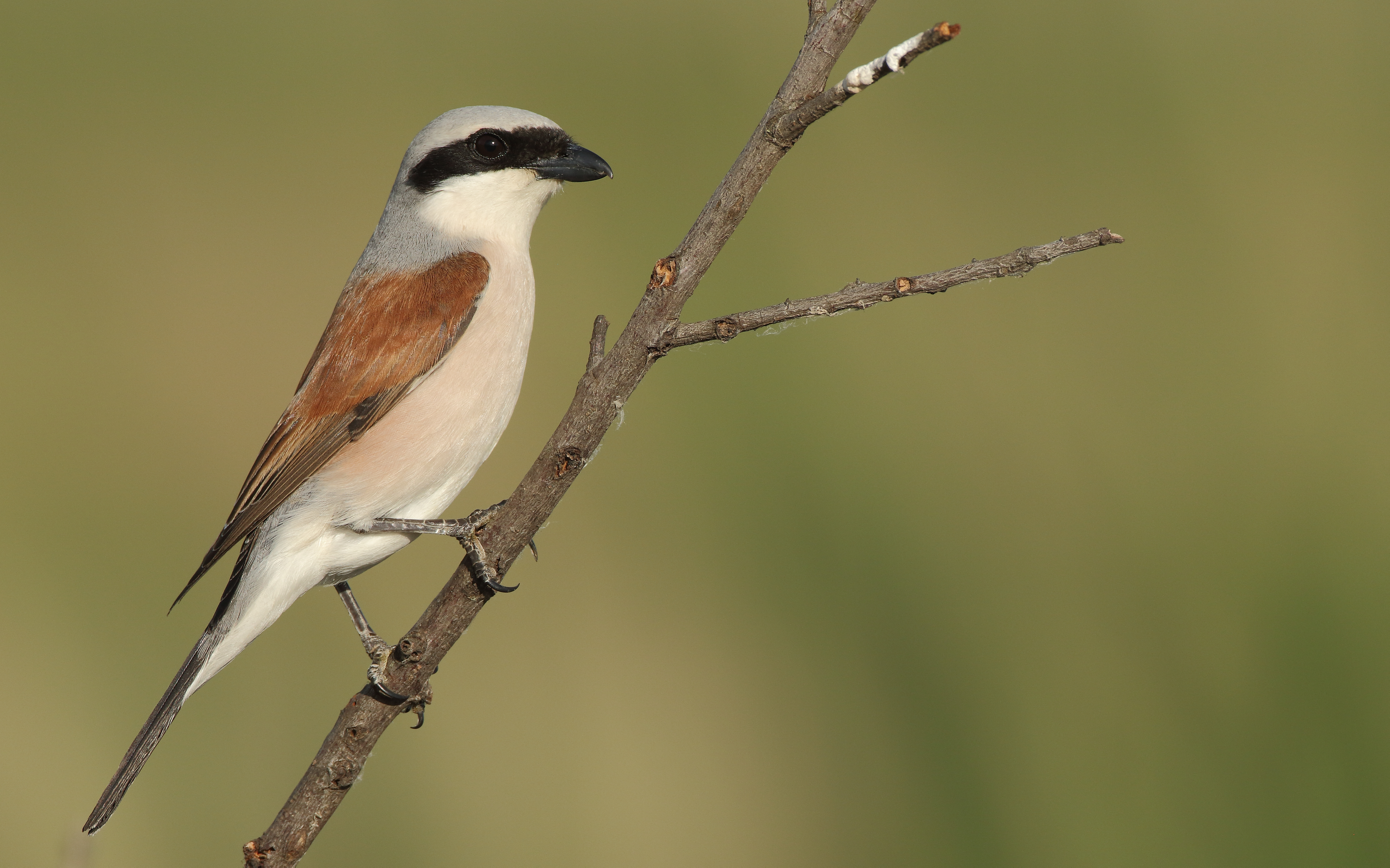
- Adult male

Conservation status
- Least Concern (IUCN 3.1)

Scientific classification
- Kingdom: Animalia
- Phylum: Chordata
- Class: Aves
- Order: Passeriformes
- Family: Laniidae
- Genus: Lanius
- Species: L. collurio

Binomial name
- Lanius collurio Linnaeus, 1758
- Range of L. collurio Breeding Passage Non-breeding

Audio
- Red-backed shrike song

= Red-backed shrike =

Species of bird

The red-backed shrike (Lanius collurio) is a carnivorous passerine bird and member of the shrike family, Laniidae. Its breeding range stretches from Western Europe east to central Russia. It is migratory and winters in the eastern areas of tropical Africa and southern Africa.

== Taxonomy ==
The red-backed shrike was formally described by the Swedish naturalist Carl Linnaeus in 1758 in the tenth edition of his Systema Naturae under its current binomial name Lanius collurio. The genus name, Lanius, is derived from the Latin word for "butcher", and some shrikes are also known as "butcher birds" because of their feeding habits. The specific collurio is from Ancient Greek kollurion, a bird mentioned by Aristotle. The common English name "shrike" is from Middle English *schrike, *schryke, from Old English sċrīc, "shriek", from the same root as shriek and screech, referring to the bird's shrill cry or call.

== Description ==
This 16–18 cm-long (6.3–7.1 in) migratory bird eats large insects, small birds, frogs, rodents and lizards. Like other shrikes it hunts from prominent perches, and impales corpses on thorns or barbed wire as a "larder." This practice has earned it the nickname of "butcher bird."

The general colour of the male's upper parts is reddish. It has a grey head and a typical shrike black stripe through the eye. Underparts are tinged pink, and the tail has a black and white pattern similar to that of a wheatear. In the female and young birds the upperparts are brown and vermiculated. Underparts are buff and also vermiculated.

== Distribution and habitat ==
This bird breeds in most of Europe and western Asia and winters in tropical Africa. The bird is listed as a "least concern" (LC) species on a global scale, but some parts of its range have seen a steep decline in numbers, so locally its status can be less secure.

=== Great Britain ===
Once a common migratory visitor to Great Britain, numbers declined sharply during the 20th century, and it is now classified as a UK 'Red List' species. The bird's last stronghold was in Breckland but by 1988 just a single pair remained, successfully raising young at Santon Downham. The following year for the first time no nests were recorded in the UK. But since then sporadic breeding has taken place, mostly in Scotland and Wales. In September 2010 the RSPB announced that a pair had raised chicks at a secret location on Dartmoor where the bird last bred in 1970. 3 Further pairs also bred on that location in Dartmoor. In 2011, two pairs nested in the same locality, fledging seven young. In 2012 there was another breeding attempt, this time unsuccessful, probably due to a prolonged spell of wet weather. In 2013 breeding was again confirmed in Devon, with two young fledged at a new site. The return to south-western England was an unexpected development, raising speculation that a warming climate might assist the bird in re-colonising some of its former haunts. However, since then breeding has been confirmed on only two occasions, both in Shetland, in 2015 and 2020.

== Gallery ==
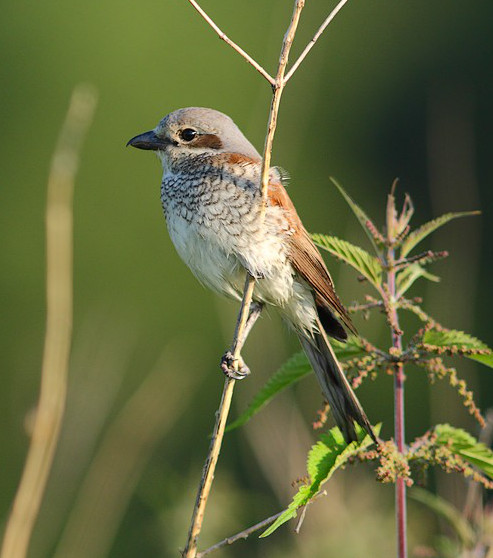
Adult female in Poland

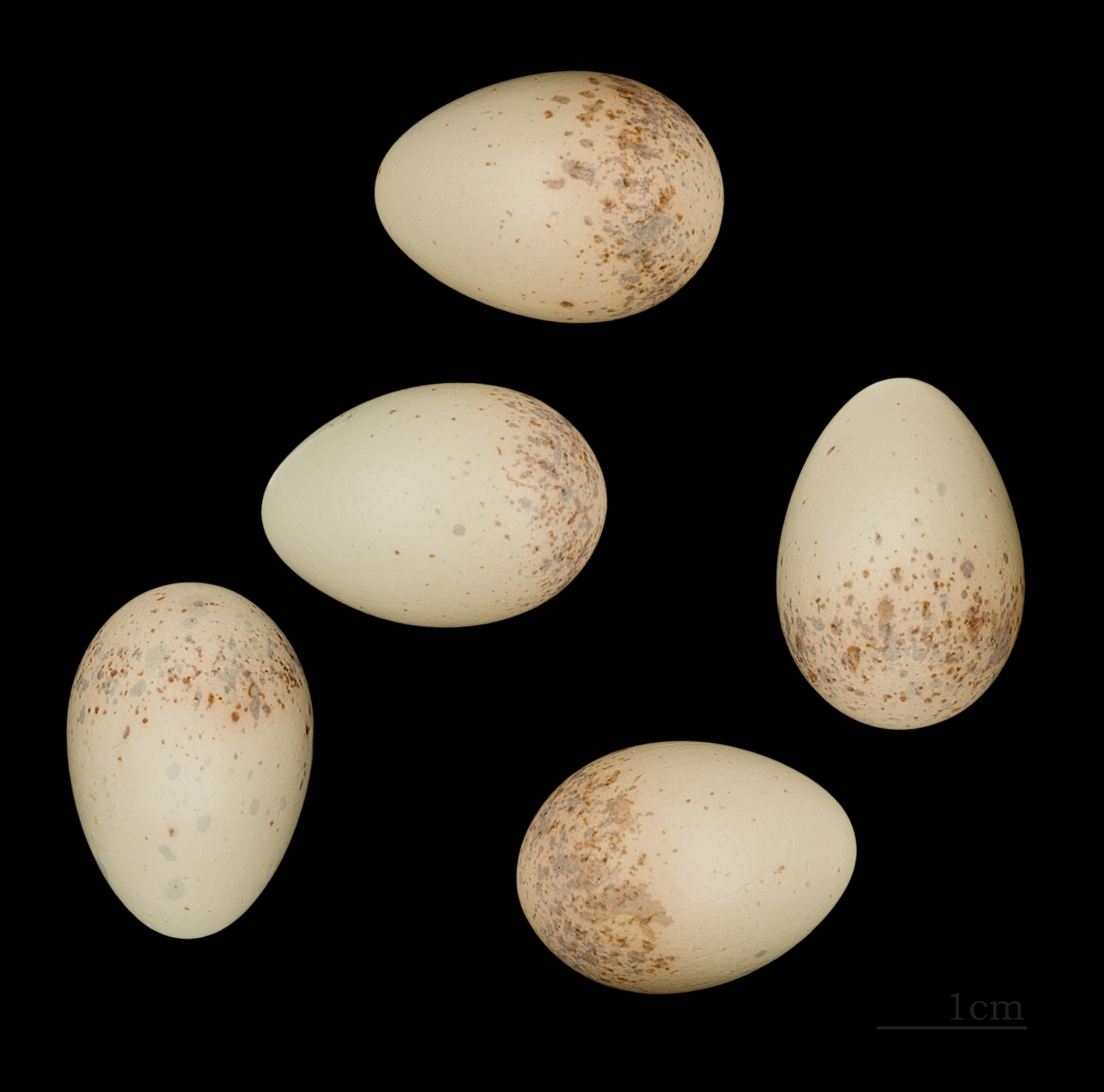
Eggs—MHNT

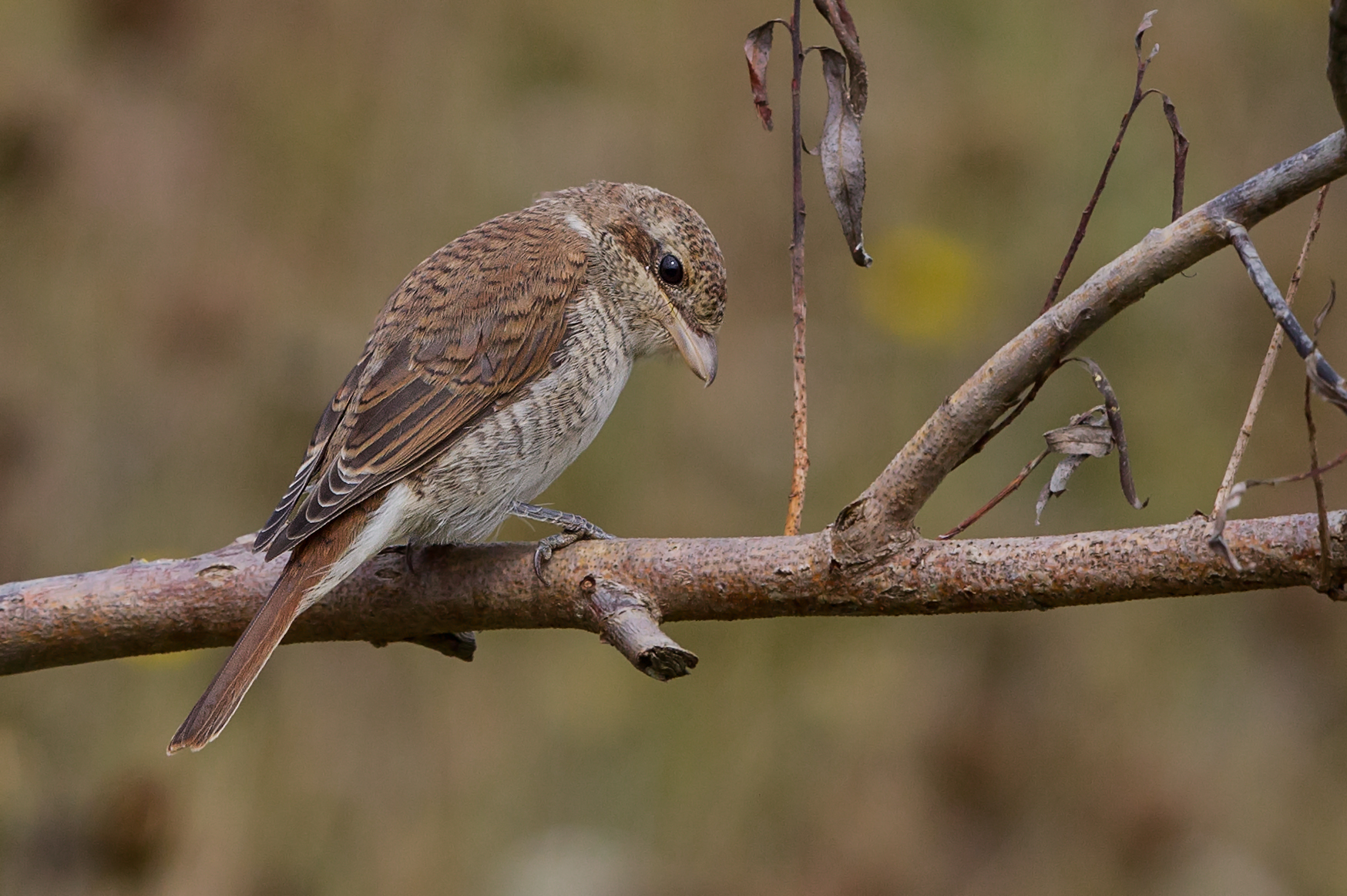
Juvenile bird

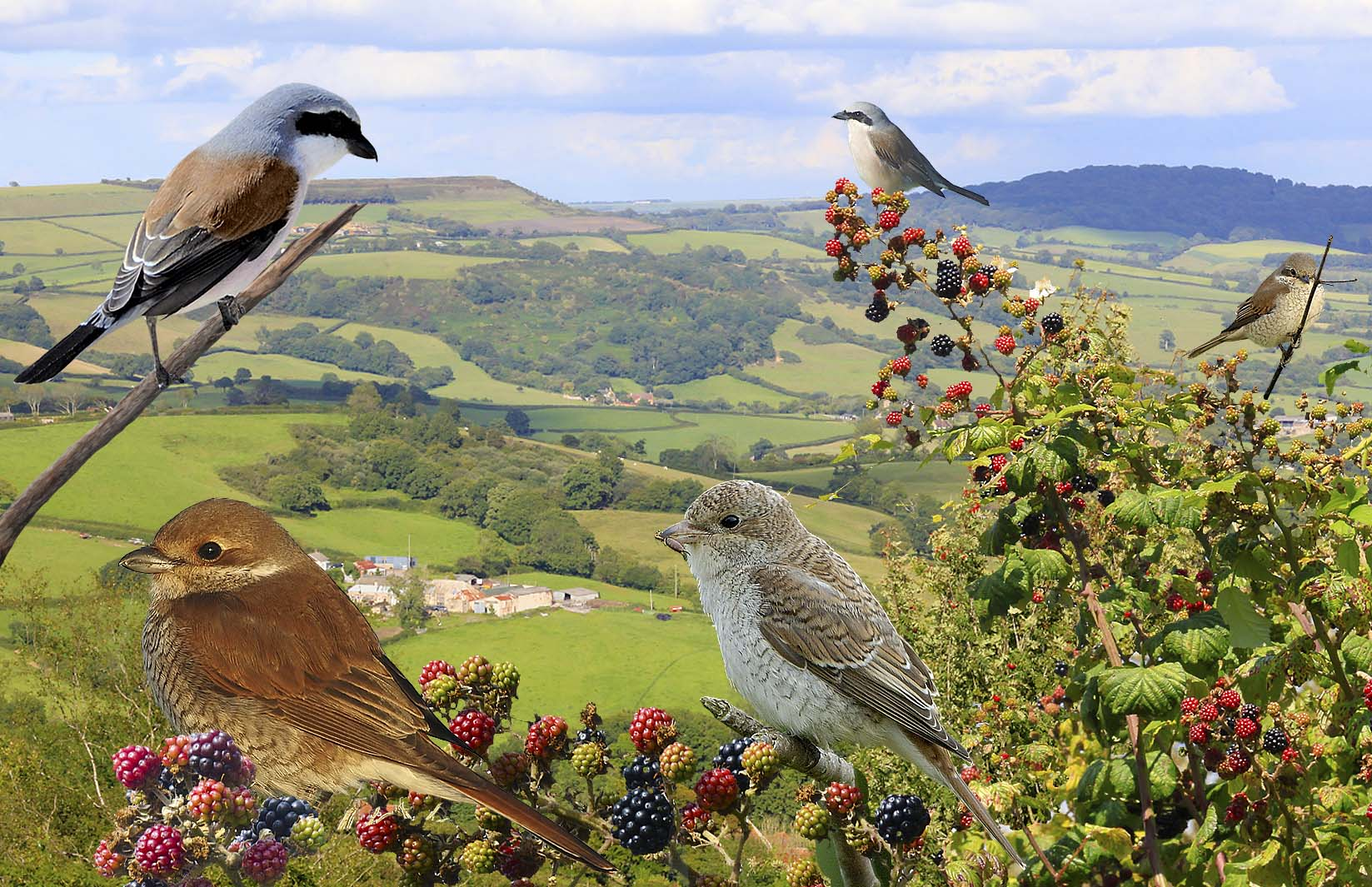
ID composite

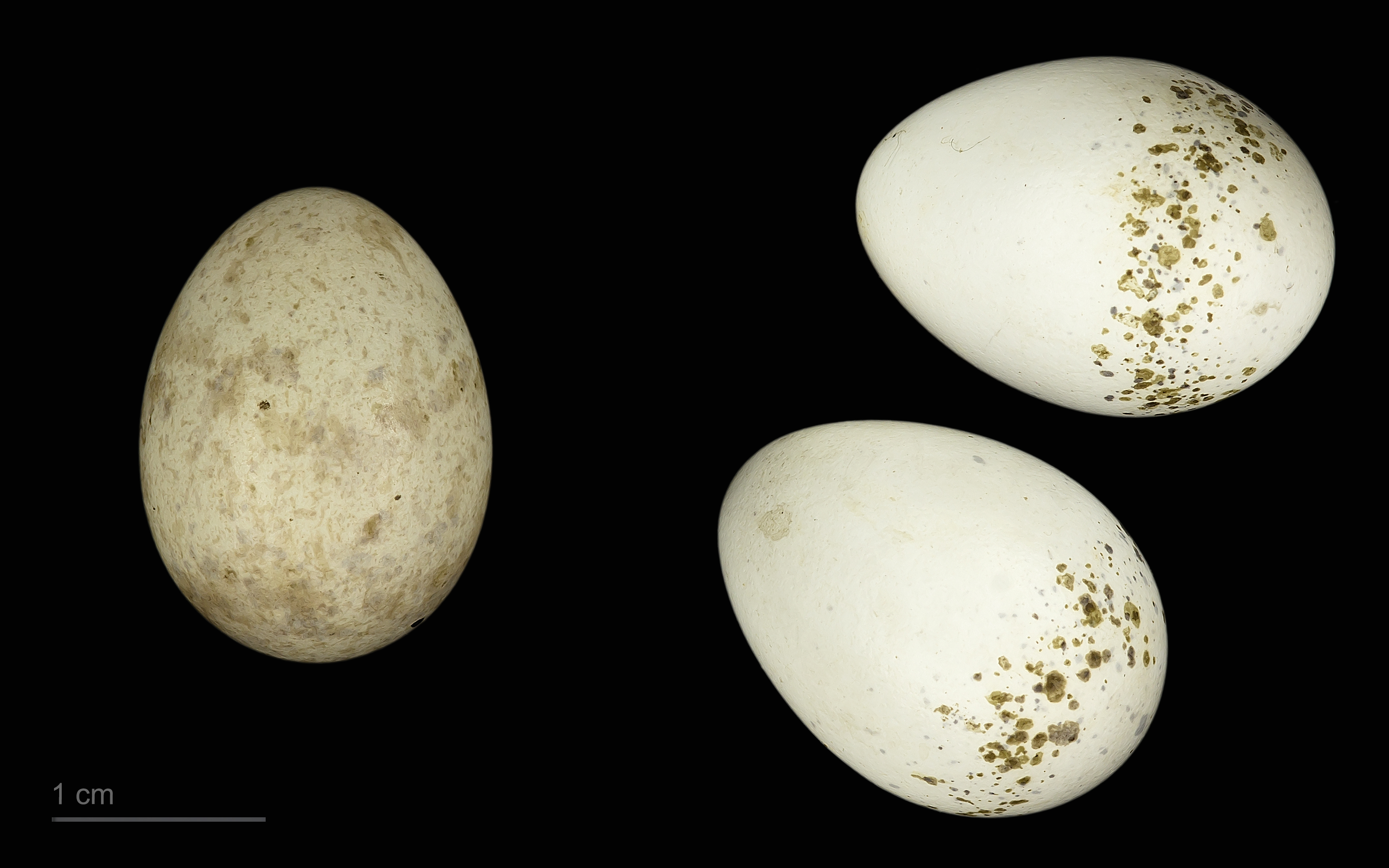
Cuculus canorus canorus in a clutch of Lanius collurio - MHNT

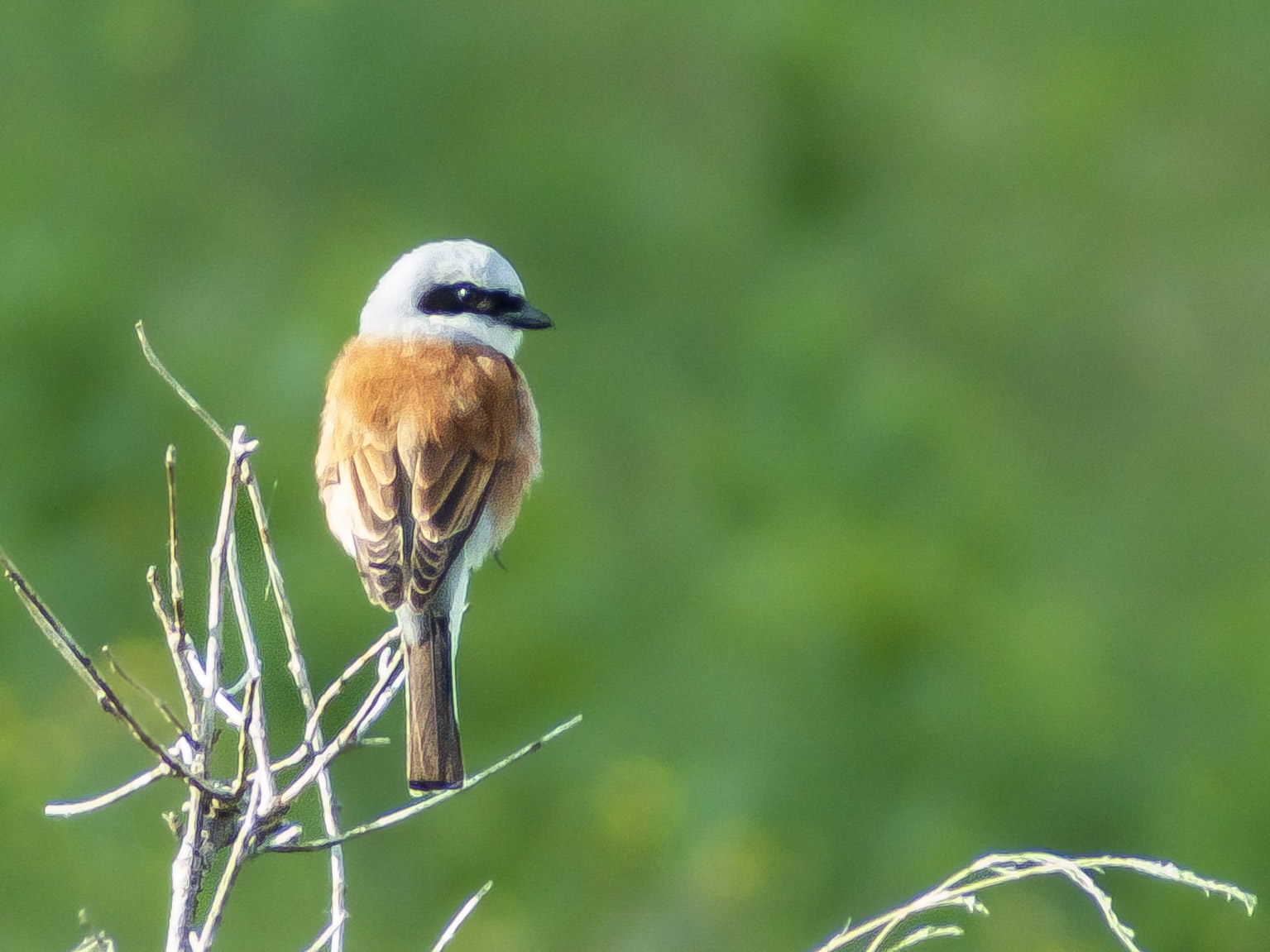
Male red-backed shrike in Sharr mountains
