= Bamba Sutherland =

Member of the Sikh Empire royal family (1869–1957)

Bamba Sofia Jindan Duleep Singh Sutherland
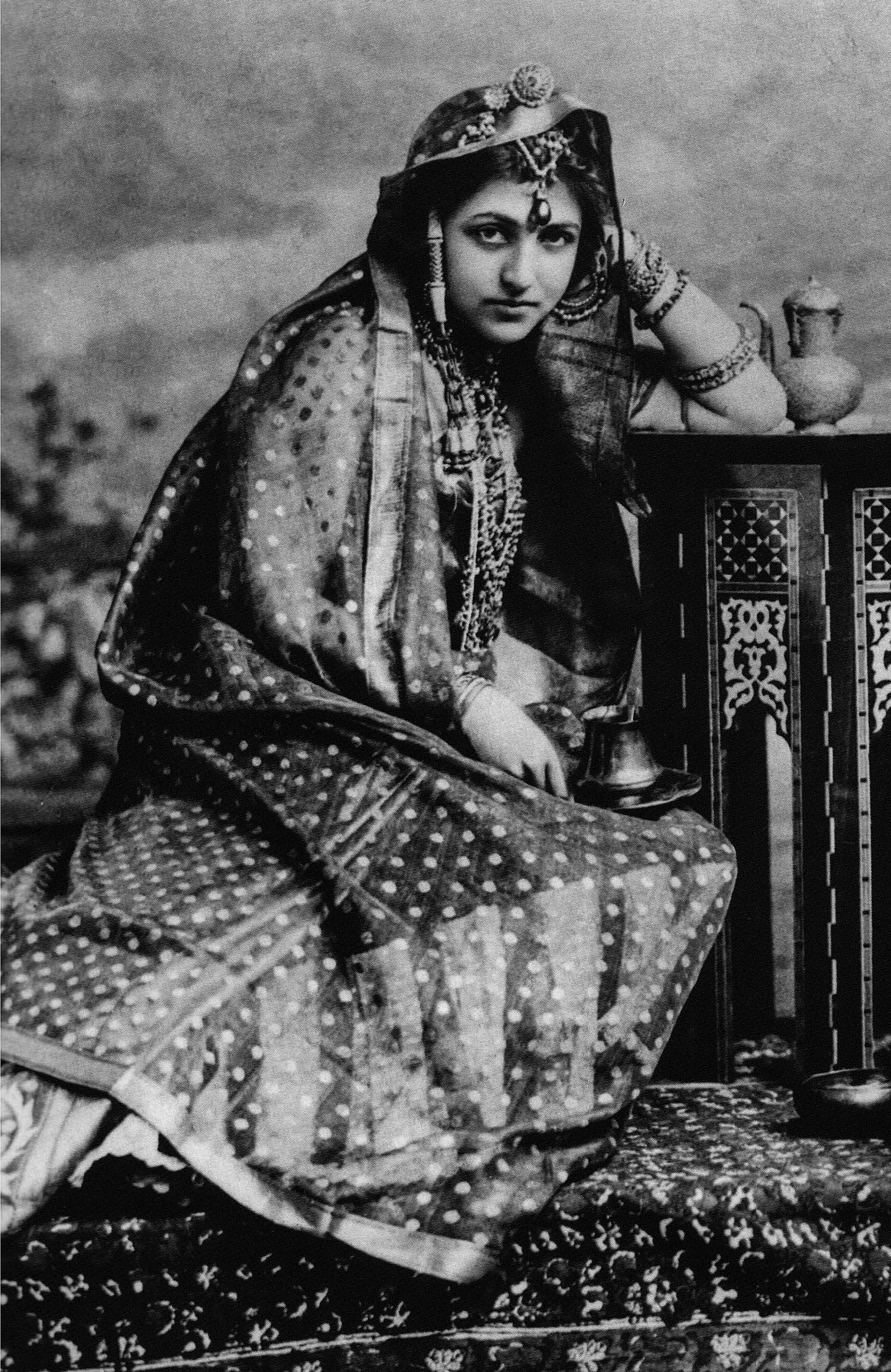
- Photograph by Lafayette Studio, circa late 19th century
- Born: Bamba Sofia Jindan Duleep Singh; 29 September 1869; London, England, United Kingdom of Great Britain and Ireland
- Died: 10 March 1957 (aged 87); Lahore, Punjab, Pakistan
- Burial: Christian Cemetery, Gulbarg, Lahore
- Spouse: David Waters Sutherland (m. 1915; died 1939)
- Father: Duleep Singh
- Mother: Bamba Müller

Princess Bamba Sofia Jindan Duleep Singh Sutherland (29 September 1869 – 10 March 1957) was the eldest daughter of Duleep Singh, the last Maharaja of the Sikh Empire and a granddaughter of Maharaja Ranjit Singh. She was the eldest sister of Catherine Duleep Singh and Sophia Duleep Singh. Raised in England, she eventually settled in Lahore, where she was a supporter of Indian independence and self-rule.

== Early life ==
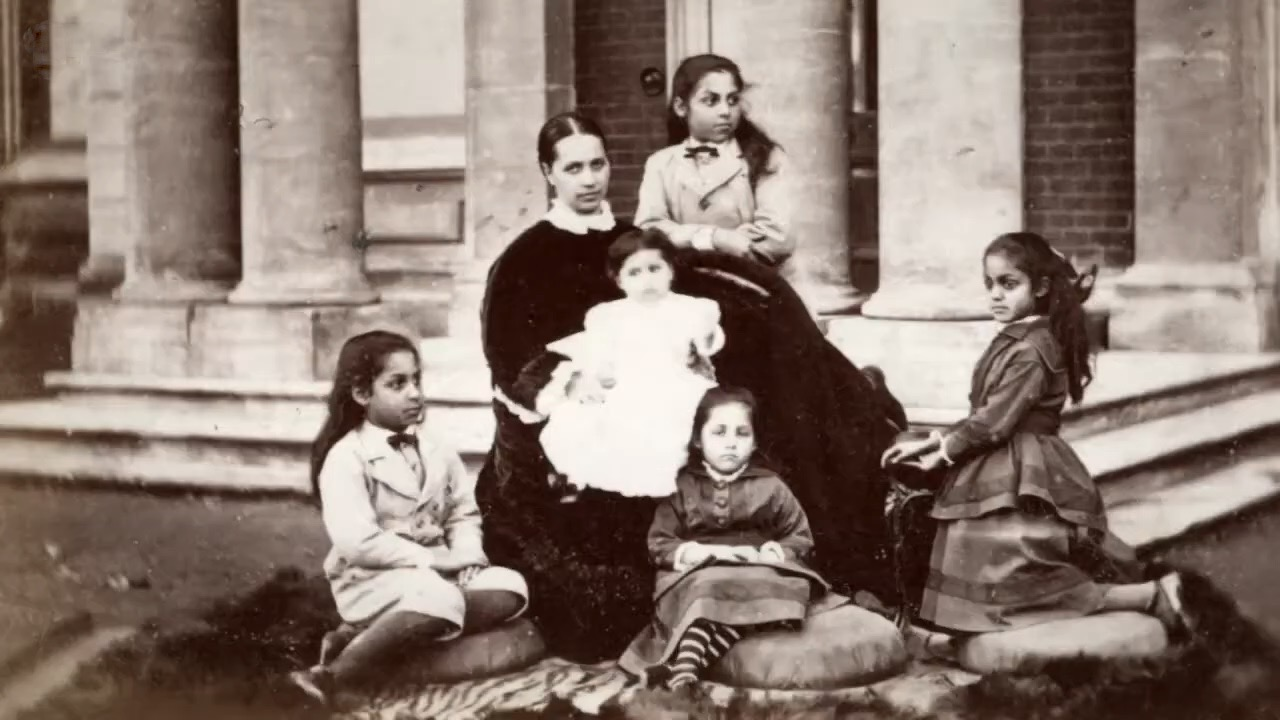
Photograph of Bamba with her mother and siblings at Elveden Hall, ca.1878

Princess Bamba was born on 29 September 1869, in London, to Maharaja Duleep Singh and his Abyssinian-German first wife Bamba Müller. Princess Bamba was named after her mother, her maternal grandmother, and her paternal grandmother. The name "Bamba" means pink in Arabic.

Duleep Singh had been brought to Britain at the age of fifteen under the care of the East India Company, after he was forced to surrender his kingdom during the Second Anglo-Sikh War and the subsequent annexation of the Punjab in 1849. He became a favourite of Queen Victoria, who ensured that his children were cared for and educated after he left England in 1886.

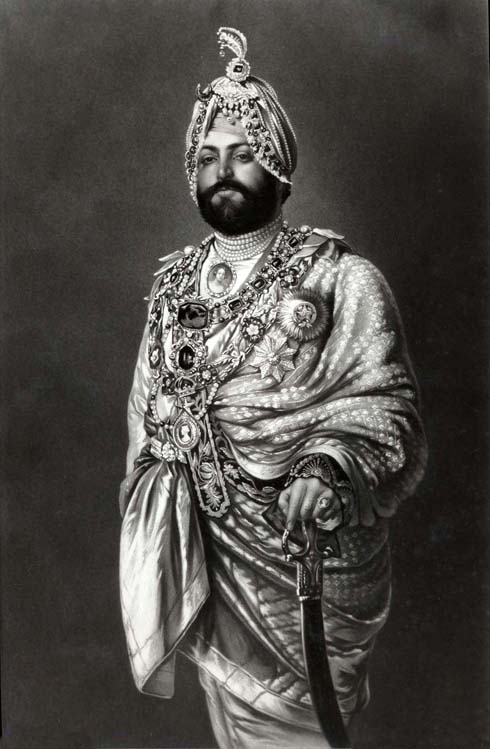
Maharajah Duleep Singh, Bamba's father. c. 1875.

Bamba was born and raised at Elveden Hall in Suffolk, before moving to London with her mother and siblings, following her father's attempt to return to India in 1886. Under the advisement of Queen Victoria, Bamba and her sister, Catherine, were educated at Somerville College, Oxford. Following her mother's death in 1887, Bamba's care was entrusted to Arthur Oliphant and his wife, in Folkestone in Kent. Her father died in 1893, in Paris, France.

Bamba and her sisters were presented to Queen Victoria as debutantes at Buckingham Palace in 1895.

In 1901, Bamba moved to Chicago, Illinois to study at Northwestern University's Women's Medical School. Her time there was cut short when the school closed in 1902.

== Life in India ==
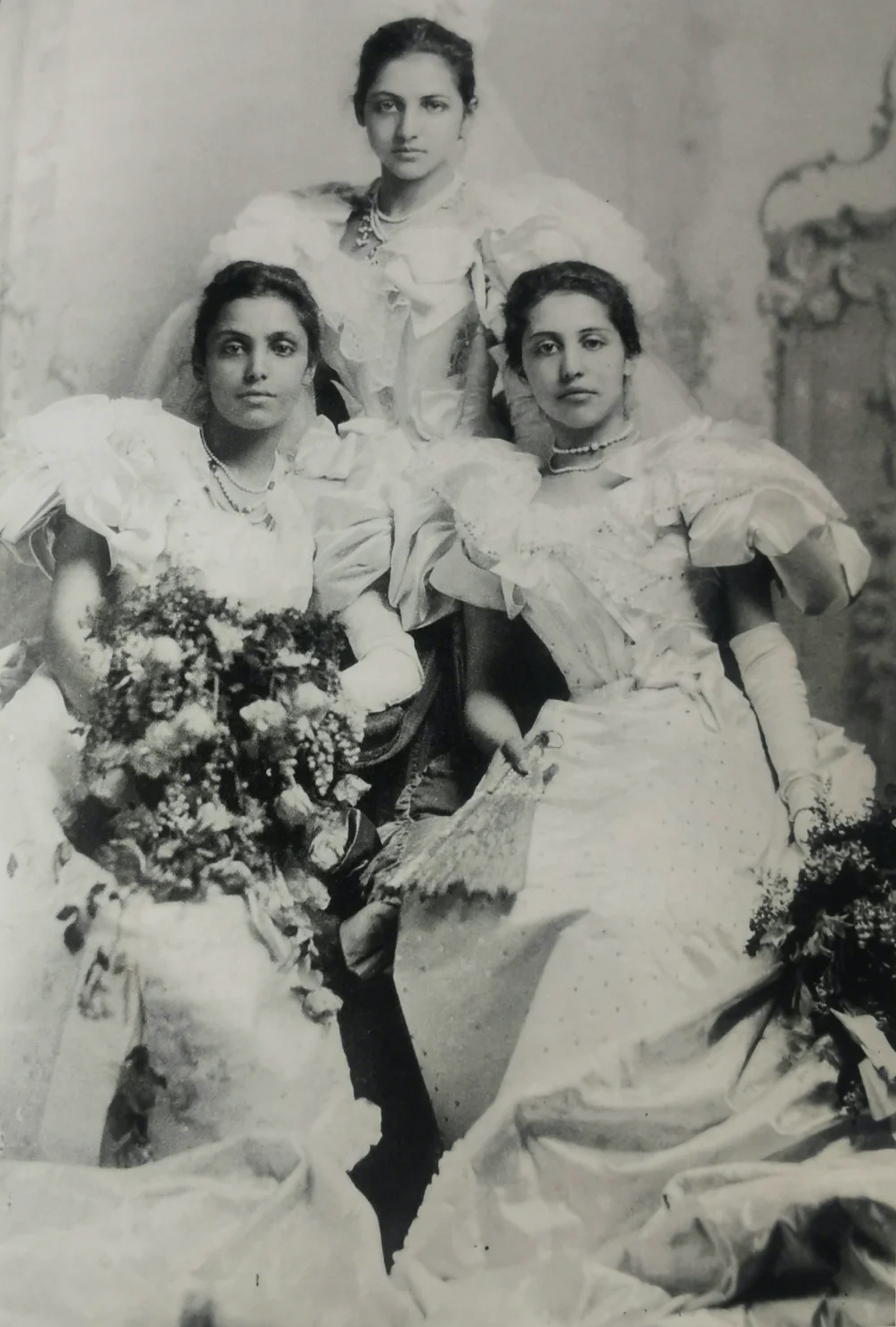
Photograph of the three daughters (L-R: Bamba, Catherine, and Sophia) of Maharaja Duleep Singh and Bamba Müller in 1895

Bamba hired the Hungarian socialite, Marie Antoinette Gottesmann, to be her companion during her travels to India. The two made a number of visits to India, before Bamba eventually settled in Lahore. Marie's daughter, Amrita Sher-Gil, would become Bamba's goddaughter.

Bamba married the Principal of King Edward Medical College in Lahore, David Waters Sutherland in 1915. The couple had no children.

In 1924, permission was finally given by the English Crown for Bamba's grandmother's ashes to be interred in Lahore. Her grandmother Maharani Jindan had died in 1863 in Kensington but the funerary rites were denied at the time. Bamba supervised the transfer of ashes from Bombay, where they had been placed when her father visited India previously, to the memorial to her grandfather, Maharaja Ranjit Singh, in Lahore.

Sutherland was widowed in Lahore when her husband died in 1939. Dr. Sutherland was the principal of the medical college of Lahore. He had moved to Scotland many years previously, but she refused to, citing her love of her home country and her hope for their independence. The home she lived in was affectionately called Gulzar (Rose Palace) and had a garden of exclusive rose varieties she cultivated herself. Her will specified that red roses be placed on her grave from time to time. She has many living relatives who were related to Maharaja Ranjit Singh who lived in what is now Punjab, India. Her family's descendants through Maharaja Ranjit Singh, including the court administrators, still own land in Amritsar, India, where her grandfather had added all the gold to the Golden Temple, Harmandir Sahib. When she finally died, her equerry and her funeral were arranged by the United Kingdom Deputy High Commissioner in Lahore, as well as a few friends as most of her comrades and companions and relatives had escaped to India during partition. She refused to leave her home and Lahore, the capital of the Sikhs, as she could not part with their kingdom.

== Death ==
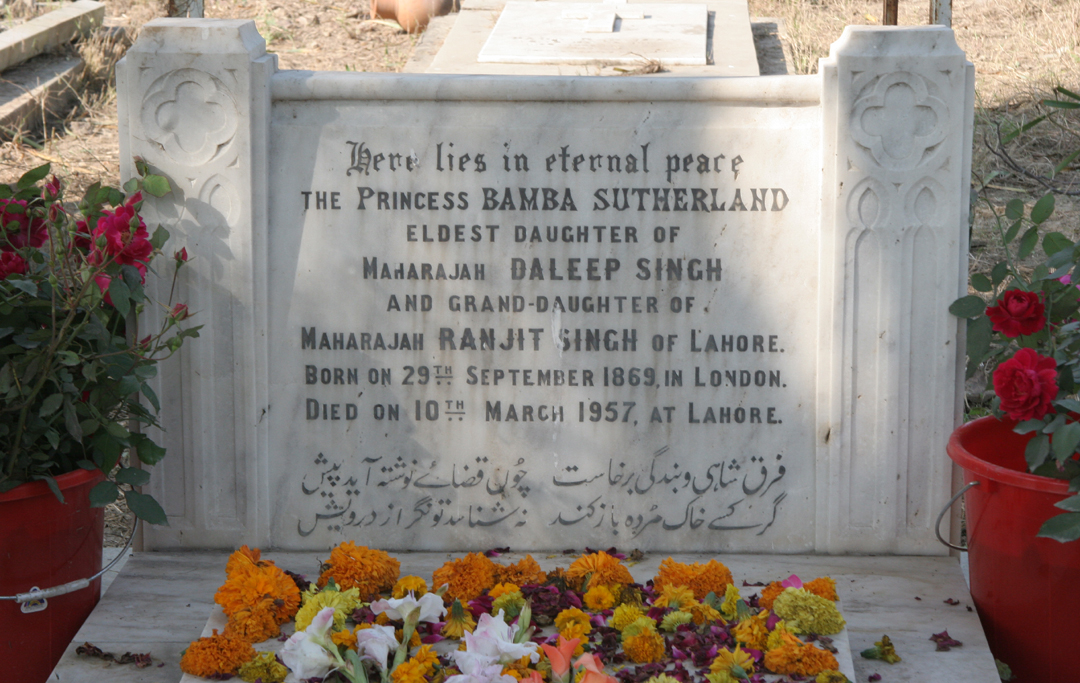
Her grave in Lahore

Sutherland died on 10 March 1957, in Pakistan. She was the last living descendant of Maharaja Ranjit Singh, and with her death his line ended. She was buried at Gora Cemetery in Lahore, with a marble plaque marking her resting place. The coordinates to her grave are 31°32'06.6"N 74°20'58.5"E.

== Legacy ==
Bamba left a large quantity of important historical items to her secretary, Pir Karim Bakhsh Supra of Lahore, who gave them to the Pakistani government to be put on public display. Many items are in disrepair and kept in a collection that can only be viewed by appointment. The collection consists of eighteen paintings, fourteen watercolours, 22 paintings on ivory, and a number of photos and other articles. The collection is kept in Lahore Fort. It is known as the Princess Bamba Collection.

The Persian distich on her gravestone has been translated as:

The difference between royalty and servility vanishes,
The moment the writing of destiny is encountered,
If one opens the grave,
None would be able to discern rich from poor.

== Ancestry ==
Ancestors of Bamba Sutherland

Budha Singh
Naudh Singh
Sardar Charat Singh
8. Sardar Maha Singh
4. High King Ranjit Singh of Punjab
9. Raj Kaur
2. High King Duleep Singh of Punjab
10. Manna Singh
5. Jind Kaur
1. Princess Bamba Duleep Singh
6. Ludwig Müller
3. Bamba Müller
7. Sofiá
