= Wangford, West Suffolk =

Village in Suffolk, England

Coordinates: 52.422°N 0.572°E

Wangford
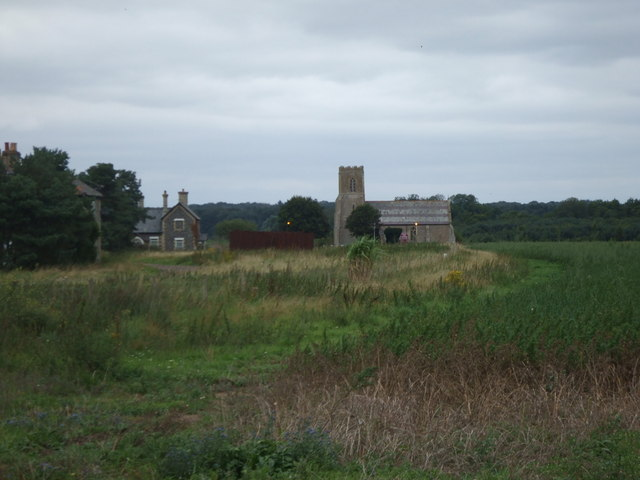
- St Denis' church, Wangford

- Location within Suffolk
- Population: 7 (2001)
- OS grid reference: TL751835
- Civil parish: Brandon
- District: West Suffolk
- Shire county: Suffolk
- Region: East
- Country: England
- Sovereign state: United Kingdom
- Post town: BRANDON
- Postcode district: IP27
- Dialling code: 01842
- UK Parliament: West Suffolk

Wangford is a village and former civil parish, now in the parish of Brandon, in the West Suffolk district of the English county of Suffolk. The RAF Lakenheath airbase is west of the former parish area with the main runway extending into it. Wangford is located around 2 miles (3.2 km) east of Lakenheath and 3 miles (4.8 km) south-west of Brandon, close to the A1065 road. In 2001 the parish had a population of 7.

Before it was combined with Brandon on 1 April 2015, the parish consisted of only a few scattered buildings including a church and 16th century hall and had one of the lowest populations of any parish in Suffolk with only seven residents at the 2001 census. In 2015 the parish was formally combined with the town of Brandon.

== History ==
There is evidence of the parish being populated since prehistoric times. Palaeolithic tools such as handaxes, arrowheads and flint scrapers have been found in the parish and there is also evidence of Iron Age and Romano-British inhabitation. A hoard of 3000 silver and bronze coins, dating from the reign of the Roman Emperor Gallienus (AD 253–68), was discovered in a jar on Wangford Heath. The jar is in Moyse's Hall Museum, Bury St Edmunds, but the coins are missing.

A Saxon inhumation burial has also been discovered in the parish. Glass and amber beads and a bronze gilded 'hinged handle' from the site are in the British Museum and a large cruciform brooch is in Birmingham Museum and Art Gallery.

At the Domesday Book survey Wangford was recorded as Wamforda. It was in Lackford Hundred and had 29 households. In the mid 19th century the parish had a population of 48 and in 1881 the population was 56.

The western edge of the parish was used as part of the site of RAF Lakenheath during the Second World War. The airfield, which is still in use as a United States Air Forces in Europe operated base, was built beginning in 1940, initially as a decoy airfield. In the post war period it was used initially as an RAF base with operational command transferring to the USAF in 1948.

== St Denis' church ==
The parish church is dedicated to St Denis and lies close to the end of the runway of RAF Lakenheath. The church has a medieval core although it was restored in the 19th century. It features 12th century doorways and a 14th-century tower and is a Grade II* listed building. The church became redundant in the 1970s and has been cared for by the New Beginnings International Church, a Southern Baptist church group from the nearby USAF airbase.

== Wangford Hall ==
Wangford Hall lies to the south of the church immediately adjacent to the airbase boundary fences. It dates from the 16th century and was the home of Sir Robert Wright, Chief Justice of the Court of King's Bench to King James II, and Sir John Holt, Lord Chief Justice from 1689 to 1710. In the 19th century it was owned by Richard Garrett the industrialist from Leiston. The hall and a barn and stable range are Grade II listed buildings.

== Geography ==
Wangford is within the Breckland area. Wangford Warren and Carr is a Site of Special Scientific Interest located in the former parish area. It features areas of inland sand dune, heathland and carr and includes areas of the rare grey hair-grass Corynephorus canescens. Much of the former parish area is within the Breckland Special Area of Conservation, and includes areas which fall within the Breckland Farmland SSSI and Breckland Forest SSSI units.

The A1065 road runs through the former parish area cutting it in two. To the south-east of the A1065 much the area of the former parish is Forestry Commission plantation, forming part of Thetford Forest.
