= Edward Guinness =

Edward Guinness may refer to:

- Edward Guinness, 1st Earl of Iveagh (1847–1927), Irish businessman and philanthropist
- Edward Guinness, 4th Earl of Iveagh (born 1969), Anglo-Irish aristocrat and businessman
