= Miranda Guinness, Countess of Iveagh =

Scottish aristocrat (1939–2010)

Miranda Daphne Jane Guinness, Countess of Iveagh (née Smiley; 19 August 1939 – 30 December 2010) was a Scottish aristocrat who married into the Guinness family.

== Life ==
She was the daughter of Major Michael Smiley, of Castle Fraser, Kemnay, Aberdeenshire.

On 12 March 1963, she married Benjamin Guinness, Viscount Elveden (who, in September 1967, became the 3rd Earl of Iveagh).

"Miranda Smiley was the most bewitching debutante of her season; gorgeous and glowing with life and humour, she was popular with the girls of her year as much as with men, and, in 1963, made the match she seemed destined for when she married Benjamin Guinness, 3rd Earl of Iveagh. Together, they were London's most dazzling golden couple, while in Ireland, still a social backwater, their glamour was practically divine."

Lord Iveagh was the heir to the Guinness fortune, and he was chairman of the brewing company from 1965 to 1995. In 1976, he had a beer tanker, purpose-built to carry Guinness from the Dublin docks to England, named "The Miranda Guinness" in her honour. In 1979, she was named as one of the world's best-dressed women.

The couple had four children: Edward, 4th Earl of Iveagh; Rory; Emma; and Louisa. The marriage was affected by Benjamin's alcoholism; they separated in the mid-1970s and were divorced in 1984. Nevertheless, she nursed him through his final illness in 1992.

Tony Ryan, the founder of Ryanair, was Miranda's lover for a period of six years until around 1991; he was still married, although separated from his wife.

"As a tutor and mentor, Miranda was perfect – cultivated, instinctive and, above all, tactful. She guided him true, shaping his natural good taste into a kind of killer focus, geared towards architecturally important buildings, "serious" art (he favoured 16th- and 17th-century Old Masters), and fine wines (he had a share in the Chateau Lascombes vineyard in Bordeaux). Along the way, they had fun together, hosting and attending parties for the kind of people Ryan wouldn't have had access to without her – wealth alone is never sufficient passport to the world of intellectuals and aristocrats."

She worked with Ryan on redesigning the interior of a Georgian house which he had bought in Pelham Place, South Kensington.

== Later years ==
The Countess bought Wilbury House, a Grade I listed Palladian mansion in Wiltshire, England and restored it between 1998 and 2004.

She celebrated her 70th birthday in August 2010 at a large party in Dublin, attended by many members of the Guinness family. The Guinness Storehouse at St James's Gate was the venue for the party as Iveagh House, which was the old family townhouse in Dublin, is occupied by the Department of Foreign Affairs and was unavailable for the occasion. Attendees included Lord Conyngham, Gay Byrne, the Duke and Duchess of Abercorn, James Mellon, former minister Des O'Malley, Sean Rafferty, and Lord and Lady Rosse.

== Death ==
Lady Iveagh died in late December 2010 at the age of 70 at her home, Wilbury House, following a long illness. Her funeral service was held in St. George's Church, Hanover Square, Mayfair. The Venerable David Pierpoint, Church of Ireland Archdeacon of Dublin, presided. She was buried alongside her husband in the Guinness family crypt at Elveden, Suffolk.
