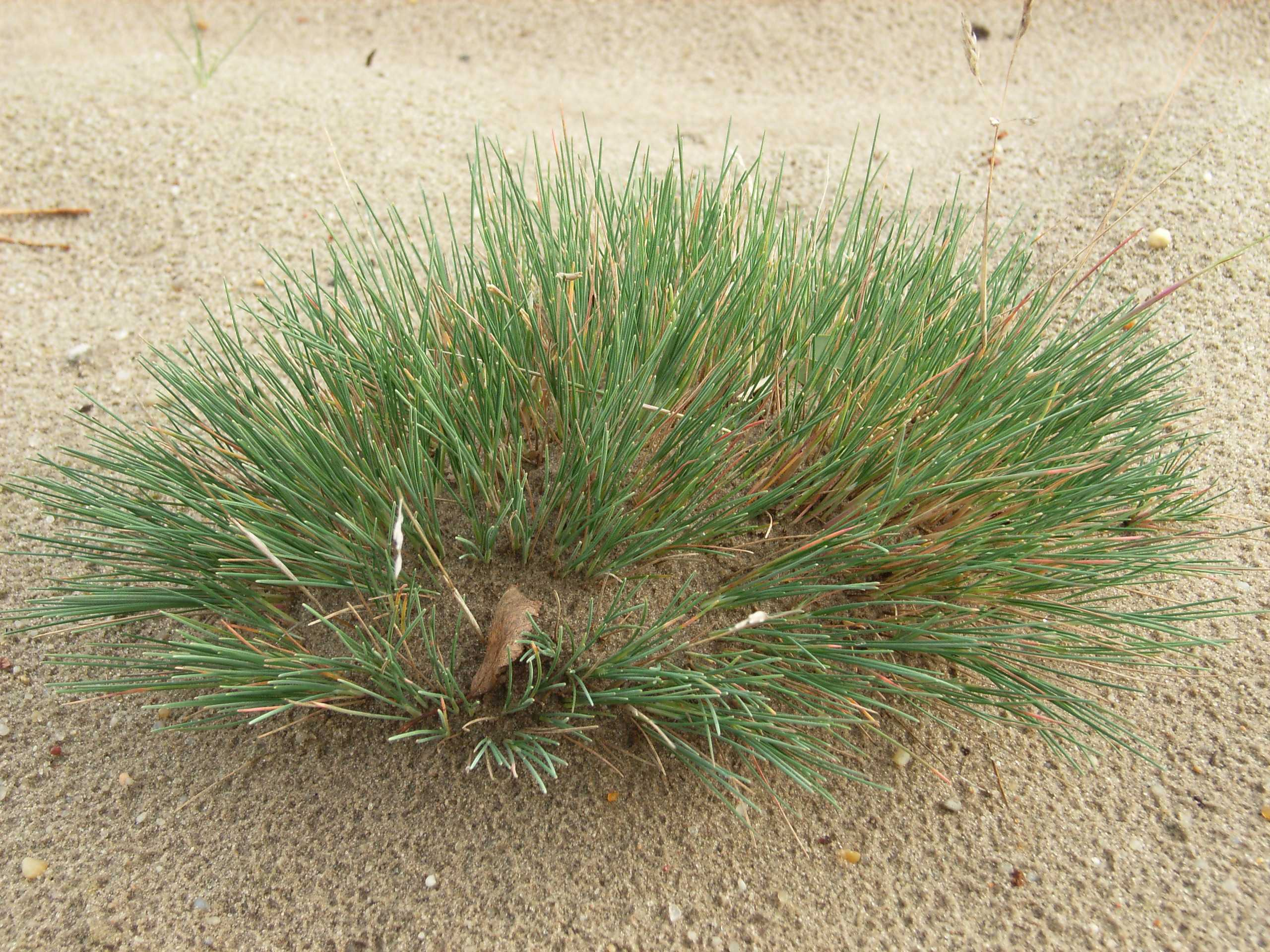
- Corynephorus canescens

Scientific classification
- Kingdom: Plantae
- Clade: Tracheophytes
- Clade: Angiosperms
- Clade: Monocots
- Clade: Commelinids
- Order: Poales
- Family: Poaceae
- Subfamily: Pooideae
- Supertribe: Poodae
- Tribe: Poeae
- Subtribe: Airinae
- Genus: Corynephorus; P.Beauv., 1812

Type species
- Aira canescens L.

Synonyms
- Anachortus V.Jirásek & Chrtek; Weingaertneria Bernh.

= Corynephorus =

Genus of grasses

Corynephorus is a genus of European, North African, and Middle Eastern plants in the grass family.

== Species ==
- Corynephorus canescens (L.) P.Beauv. - Europe (from Portugal to Norway to Russia), Morocco
- Corynephorus deschampsioides Bornm. - Syria, Israel, Jordan, Palestine
- Corynephorus divaricatus (Pourr.) Breistr. - Mediterranean and nearby regions from Spain + Morocco to Iran
- Corynephorus fasciculatus Boiss. & Reut. - Portugal, Spain, France incl Corsica, Sardinia, Sicily, Algeria
- Corynephorus macrantherus Boiss. & Reut. - Portugal, Spain, Morocco, Algeria, Tunisia
