= Edward Guinness, 4th Earl of Iveagh =

Anglo-Irish aristocrat and businessman

The Right Honourable The Earl of Iveagh DL

Member of the House of Lords
- Lord Temporal
- In office 18 June 1992 – 11 November 1999 as a hereditary peer
- Preceded by: The 3rd Earl of Iveagh
- Succeeded by: Seat abolished (Note: Pursuant to the House of Lords Act 1999.)

Personal details
- Born: Arthur Edward Rory Guinness; 10 July 1969 (age 56) County Kildare, Ireland
- Party: None (crossbencher)
- Spouse: Clare Hazell (m. 2001–2021)
- Children: 2
- Relatives: Guinness
- Occupation: Brewing and farming

Arthur Edward Rory Guinness, 4th Earl of Iveagh (born 25 August 1969), styled Viscount Elveden until 1992, is an Anglo-Irish aristocrat and businessman. Lord Iveagh is a member of the Guinness family.

== Biography ==
An Anglo-Irish aristocrat, Iveagh is the son of Benjamin Guinness, 3rd Earl of Iveagh, and his wife, Miranda Smiley, and is known to his family and friends as Edward, or Ned, Iveagh.

Becoming Earl of Iveagh on his father's death on 18 June 1992, when he was aged 23, he was then one of the youngest hereditary peers entitled to sit in the House of Lords, which he regularly attended. He did not join a political party but sat as a crossbencher. On 11 November 1999, he was among the majority of the hereditary members who were removed from the Lords by the House of Lords Act 1999.

On 27 October 2001, Lord Iveagh married the interior designer Clare Hazell at St Andrew's and St Patrick's Church, Elveden, Suffolk. The couple have two sons, including Arthur, Viscount Elveden (born 2002). They subsequently divorced, and she died of brain cancer in 2025.

Iveagh lives on the 22,486-acre (91 km^{2}) Elveden Estate in Suffolk, England, which comprises some 2.6% of the county. The land is occupied as a single arable farm for growing root vegetables, with cereals as a break crop. Approximately 4,000 acres (16 km^{2}) is woodland.

In 1999, Iveagh sold his family's Irish home, Farmleigh, and its park, adjacent to the Phoenix Park in Dublin, to the Irish Government for the market price of €29.2m (£18.9m).

== Arms ==
Coat of arms of Edward Guinness, 4th Earl of Iveagh
| Earl of Iveagh | Coronet A Coronet of an Earl Crest 1st: A Boar passant quarterly Or and Gules (Magennis); 2nd: On a Pillar Argent encircled by a Ducal Coronet Or an Eagle preying on a Bird's Leg erased proper Escutcheon Quarterly: 1st and 4th, Per saltire Gules and Azure a Lion rampant Or on a Chief Ermine a Dexter Hand couped at the wrist of the first (Guinness); 2nd and 3rd, Argent on a Fess between three Crescents Sable a Trefoil slipped Or (Lee) Supporters On either side a Stag Gules collared gemel and attired Or each resting a hind hoof upon an Escutcheon Vert charged with a Lion rampant Or Motto Spes Mea In Deo (My hope is in God) |

== Notes ==
Peerage of the United Kingdom
| Preceded by Benjamin Guinness | Earl of Iveagh; 1992–present Member of the House of Lords (1992–1999) | Incumbent; Heir apparent: Arthur Guinness, Viscount Elveden |
| Preceded by Benjamin Guinness | Viscount Iveagh; 1992–present | Incumbent; Heir apparent: Arthur Guinness, Viscount Elveden |
| Preceded by Benjamin Guinness | Baron Iveagh; 1992–present | Incumbent; Heir apparent: Arthur Guinness, Viscount Elveden |
Baronetage of the United Kingdom
| Preceded by Benjamin Guinness | Baronet of Castleknock; 1992–present | Incumbent; Heir apparent: Arthur Guinness, Viscount Elveden |
