= Santon Downham Tramway =

Defunct railway in Suffolk, England

Santon Downham Tramway Downham Hall Timber Railway
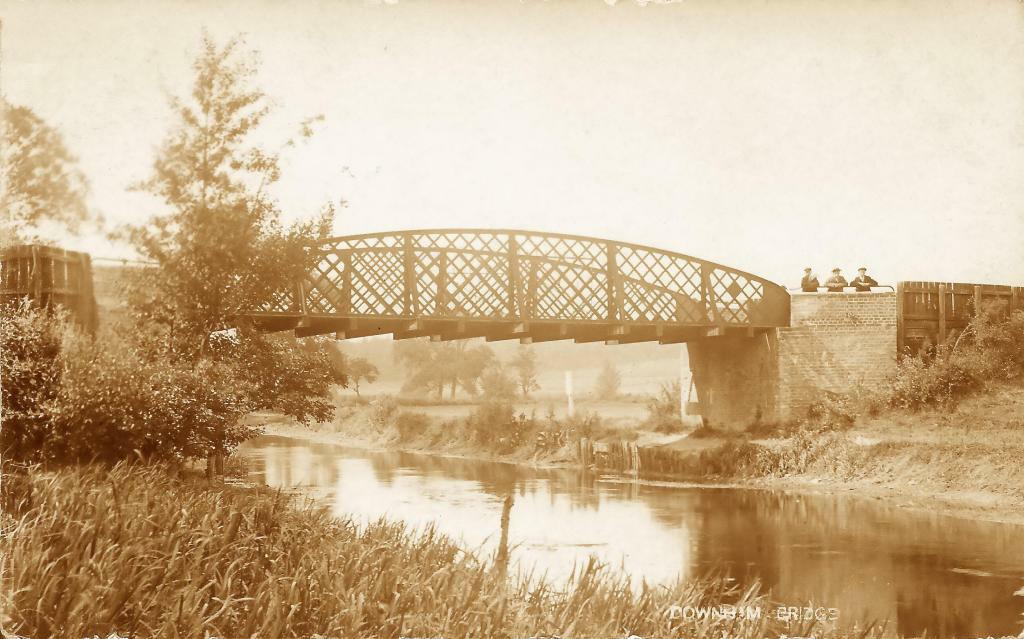
- Iron bridge over the River Little Ouse near Santon Downham

Technical
- Line length: 6 kilometres (3.7 mi)
- Track gauge: 3 ft (914 mm)
Route map
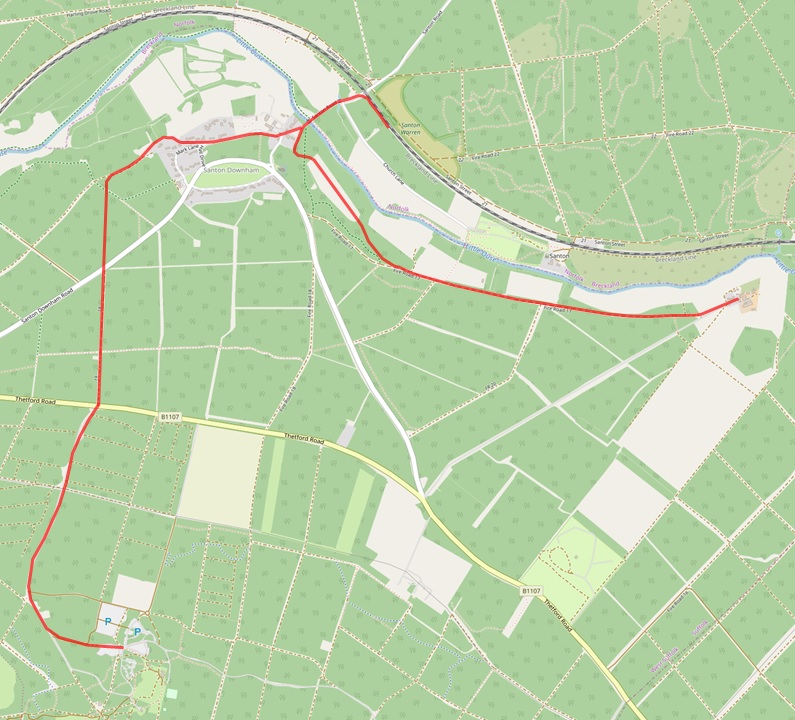
Presumed route superimposed onto modern map

The Santon Downham Tramway or Downham Hall Timber Railway was a 6 kilometres (3.7 mi) long forest railway with a gauge of 3 ft (914 mm) in Santon Downham near Thetford in England, which was operated around 1918 to 1922.

== History ==
The Canadian army operated a total of 89 sawmills in the United Kingdom and France during World War I. Together with the British Pioneer Corps, they laid the forest railway line near Santon Downham for the Home Grown Timber Board, part of the Ministry of Supply, during World War I. The sawmill was put into operation on 27 July 1918. In the second half of 1918, a total of 1,244 cubic metres (43,940 cubic feet, 527,289 board feet) of lumber was harvested there. The line was privatised after the war and lifted in the late 1920s.

== Route ==
The forest railway had a track gauge of 3 ft (914 mm). The 3.5 kilometres (2.2 mi) long main line ran from the sawmill on the Cambridge-Norwich standard gauge railway line to the High Lodge and a 2.5 kilometres (1.6 mi) long branch line to Little Lodge Farm. The line is not shown on historical maps, so that there are four different theories about its course.

The sawmill was located on a siding southwest of the standard gauge line, where a creosote factory was built in 1947. The line led from there via a bridge over the river that was built by Stockton M I Co. Iron, which was temporarily reinforced for forest railroad operations by a central pillar. The engine shed stood next to the post office.

A turntable at the school building served the branch line, which led eastwards along the river valley to Little Lodge Farm near Two Mile Bottom. The main line ran westward through the village to Woodcock Cottage, where it turned south, probably using another turntable, and led on flat terrain and the hill southwest of the village around the High Lodge.

== Locomotives ==
Three Bagnall locomotives with the works numbers 2081, 2085 and 2086 were used on the line. The 0-4-0 saddletank locomotives had two cylinders each with 178 mm × 305 mm (7.0 in × 12.0 in) bore × stroke. Their wheels had a diameter of 546 mm (21 1/2 in). The locomotive with works number 2081 was delivered by W. G. Bagnall to the "Ministry of Munitions OC 126 Company Canadian Forestry Corps Downham Hall Brandon Suffolk" in February 1919 and sold by the Board of Trade in 1922. The locomotives with works numbers 2085 and 2086 were identical in construction to No. 2081 and were delivered by Bagnall in March 1919 to the technical warehouse of the Canadian Forestry Corps (Minister of Militia and Defence, MofM) in the London borough of Bellingham.
