= MV Miranda Guinness =

Former freight ship

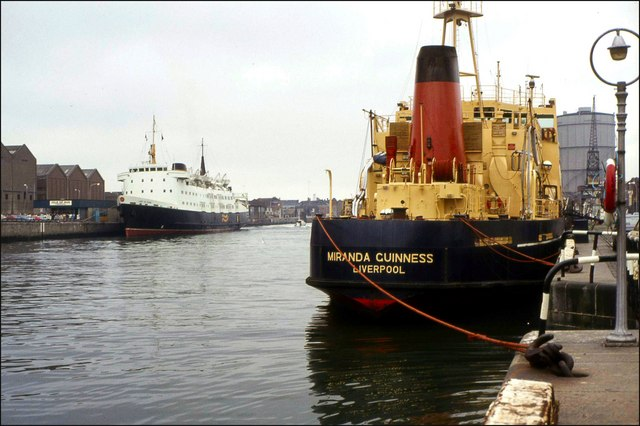
MV Miranda Guinness

MV Miranda Guinness was a vessel in the Guinness shipping fleet. She was built at Charles Hill & Sons of Bristol in 1976 and named after Miranda Guinness, Countess of Iveagh. She went into service in January 1977, first sailing from Dublin Port to Runcorn and regularly plied the Dublin to Liverpool route.

In 1985 the ship collided with the East Link Bridge.

She was sold and scrapped in 1993 at the Manchester Ship Canal.
