= David Waters Sutherland =

Australian physician

David Waters Sutherland CIE FRSE (18 December 1872 – 19 April 1939) was an Australian physician who was a principal of the King Edward Medical College in Lahore. He married Princess Bamba Singh.

== Biography ==
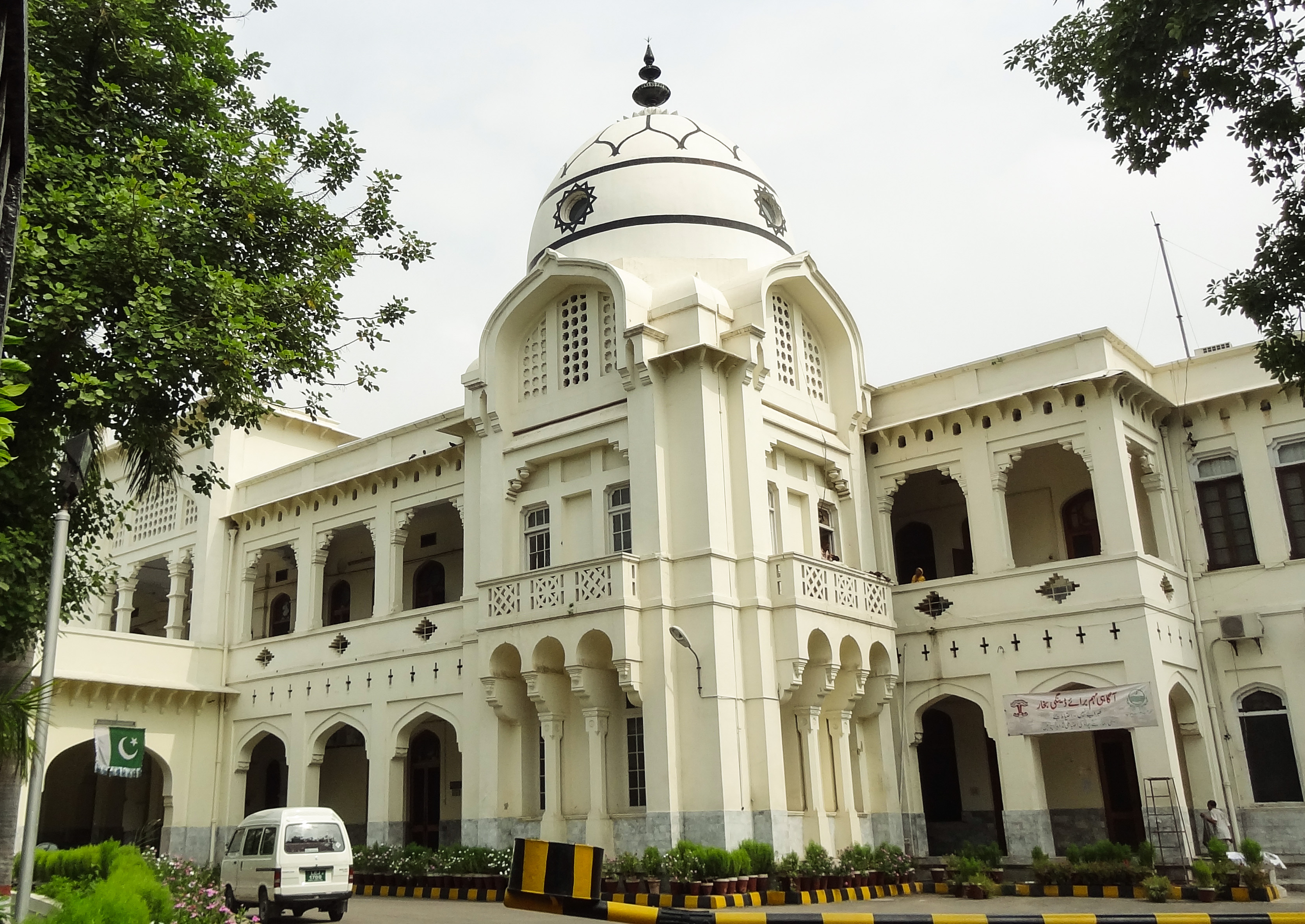
King Edward Medical College in Lahore

He was born in Buninyong on 18 December 1872, the son of Wilhelmina Waters and her husband, John Sutherland of Allendale, Victoria. He was educated at Creswick Grammar School, then Melbourne University.

He studied medicine at the University of Edinburgh, Scotland, graduating with an MB ChB in 1893, then took the exams for the Indian Medical Service. He subsequently qualified for the post-graduate Doctor of Medicine (MD). He was also a member of the (English) Royal College of Physicians (MRCP).

Originally attached to the Indian Army as part of the Indian Medical Service, he went to Bengal as a surgeon lieutenant in 1894. He served in the Chitral Campaign of 1895. He later served in engagements at both Malakand and Panjkora. He was promoted to major in 1905 and in 1919 was consulting physician to the Afghanistan Field Force. He reached the rank of lieutenant colonel.

Concurrently, in 1897 he became professor of materia medica and pathology at the King Edward Medical College in Lahore. In 1909 he became principal and director of the college, also continuing as professor of medicine.

In 1902, he received his medical degree from the University of Edinburgh, and was elected a Fellow of the Royal Society of Edinburgh the following year. His proposers were Sir William Turner, Sir Thomas Richard Fraser, Alexander Bruce and John Chiene.

In 1917, he was created a Commander of the Order of the Indian Empire (CIE) by King George V.

Sutherland retired in 1926 and returned to Scotland soon after. It is unclear if his wife, Princess Bamba, went with him. He died at "Braeside" at Belhaven on the outskirts of Dunbar in Scotland on 19 April 1939.

== Family ==
In 1915, he married Princess Bamba Singh daughter of Prince Duleep Singh, last of the family dynasty which had controlled the entire Punjab. They had no children.

== Publications ==
- Differential Diagnosis of Fevers (1909)
