= Barton Mills =

Village in Suffolk, England

Coordinates: 52.335°N 0.52°E

- Location within Suffolk
- Interactive map of Barton Mills
- Population: 1,052 (2011)
- District: West Suffolk
- Shire county: Suffolk
- Region: East
- Country: England
- Sovereign state: United Kingdom
- Post town: Bury St Edmunds
- Postcode district: IP28

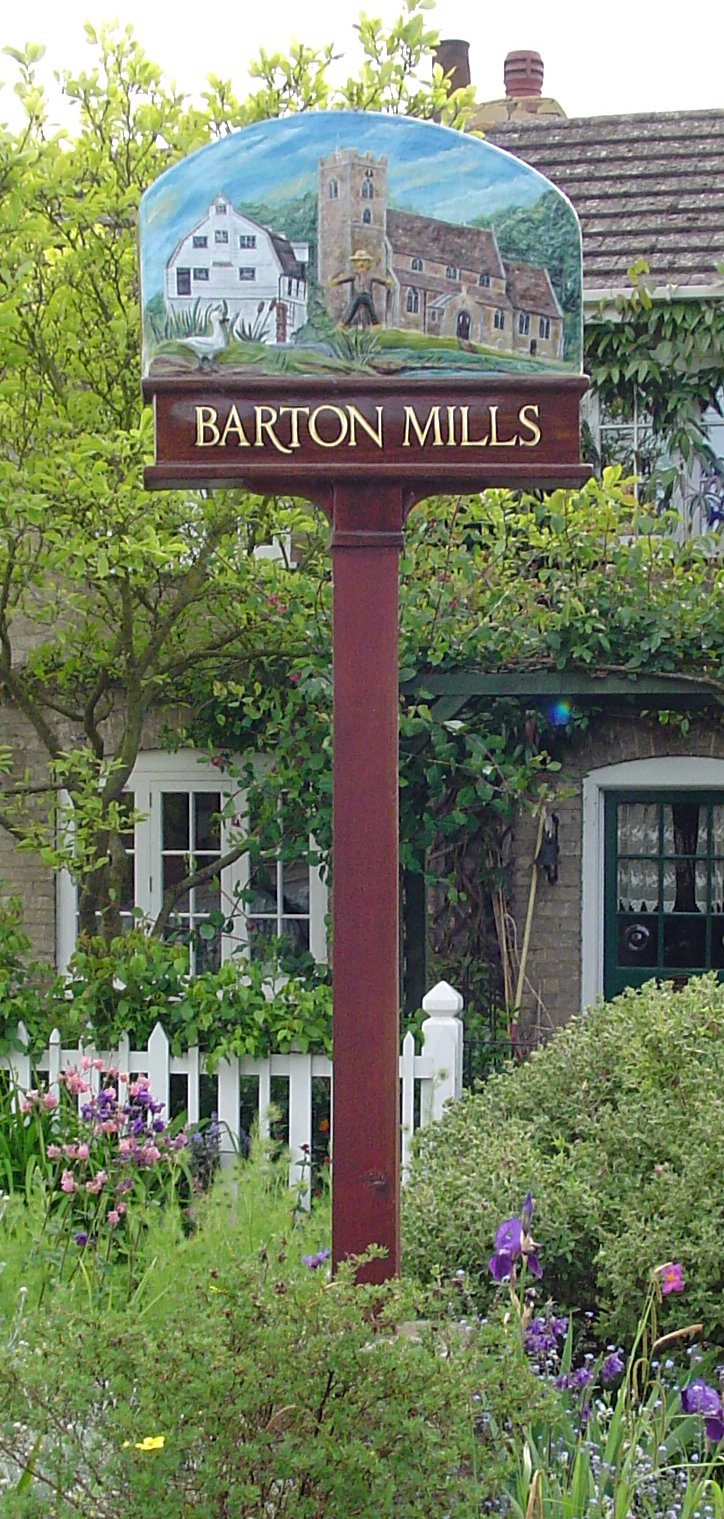
Village sign in Barton Mills

Barton Mills is a village and civil parish in the West Suffolk district of Suffolk, England. The village is on the south bank of the River Lark. According to Eilert Ekwall the meaning of the village name is 'corn farm by the mill'.

== History ==
The village was originally called Barton Parva (Little Barton). The name changed to Barton Mills in the eighteenth century.

The Domesday Book of 1086 records the village as being in Lackford Hundred with a population of 22 households.

The village was once the holiday retreat for Alexander Fleming, the discoverer of penicillin, and there is a plaque on the wall outside his country home, The Dhoon, in the main street.

== Location ==
The village is near the Fiveways Roundabout, a busy junction where the A11 London to Norwich trunk road, the A1065 towards North Norfolk and the A1101 (Long Sutton (Lincolnshire) to Bury St. Edmunds) roads meet.

== Barton Mills Scarecrow Festival ==
Barton Mills hosts a biannual Scarecrow Festival, held in July. The main road through the village is closed to traffic (except to residents) during the two-day-long festival, which includes musical bands, food, dancing, car boot sales at the local playing fields and viewing scarecrows created by local residents. This festival has been featured in the Guinness Book of World Records, boasting the most scarecrows ever made at any one time. The record is currently held by the National Forest Adventure Farm near Burton on Trent.

== Church ==
Barton Mills is served by the Church of St Mary as its parish church, a building dating back 800 years.

Giacomo Savelli, who became Pope Honorius IV in 1285 was rector of Barton Mills church at the time of his election to the papacy, although there is no evidence that he ever visited England.
