= Budha Singh =

Sikh warrior

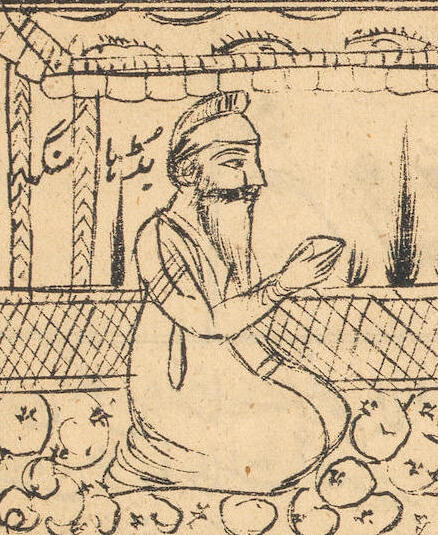
Budh Singh, detail from a larger illustration, lithograph, Umdat-ut-Tawarikh (vol. II), Albert Press, Lahore, 1886

Budha Singh (ca.1670 - disputed), also spelt as Budh Singh or Budda Singh, was a Sikh warrior. He was the father of Naudh Singh, the grandfather of Charat Singh, great-grandfather of Maha Singh, and the great-great-grandfather of Ranjit Singh.

== Name ==
Budha was nicknamed Desu after his horse, Desi, and would later be given the baptized Khalsa name of Budh Singh.

== Biography ==
Budh Singh was born as Desu in around 1670 and was the son of Baru. Budh Singh was from a Jat background. Budh Singh's ancestors were cattlemen and farmers around the Gujranwala area, with Budh being the first in the family to rise to significant notability. Budh's father Baru was the first of the family who had associations with Sikhism, as he was a follower of the founder, Guru Nanak, and an avid reader of the Adi Granth (as it was then known). Baru had wanted to get baptized into the Khalsa order but was unable to fulfill this desire. On his deathbed in 1679, Baru told his son, Budda, to get baptized in Amritsar as a dying wish for his son to fulfil. Once he reached an age of maturity, Budda was baptized into the Khalsa order and was renamed as Budh Singh. His Pahul initiation ceremony said to have been directly administered by Guru Gobind Singh himself.

Lore connects Budh to a piebald mare he rode named Desan, with the names of the two often being evoked together as Desan Budh Singh. Other sources claim his horse was named Desi.

Budh Singh was a warrior of high repute in his time, being renowned for his stamina and he engaged in raiding. Through his martial activities, a region of a few villages was controlled by Budh and surrounding areas paid the rakhi tax to him. Budh Singh owned around 25 acres of land, three ploughs, and a well, and constructed structures for people and cattle on his land, which became known as Sukar Chak (from sukar meaning small or narrow and chak referring to a petty tract of land).

When Budh Singh died, it is claimed that Budh Singh's corpse exhibited wounds from sabres and muskets. After Budh's death, his wife committed suicide so they were cremated together.

Budh was survived by two sons, Naudh Singh and Chanda Singh. Naudh Singh would succeed Budh as head of the Sukerchakia family. Meanwhile, Chanda was the progenitor of the Sandhawalia family of Raja Sansi.

== Death year ==
His year of death varies depending on the source. Some give a year of death of 1716 whilst others, such as Khushant Singh, give 1718.
