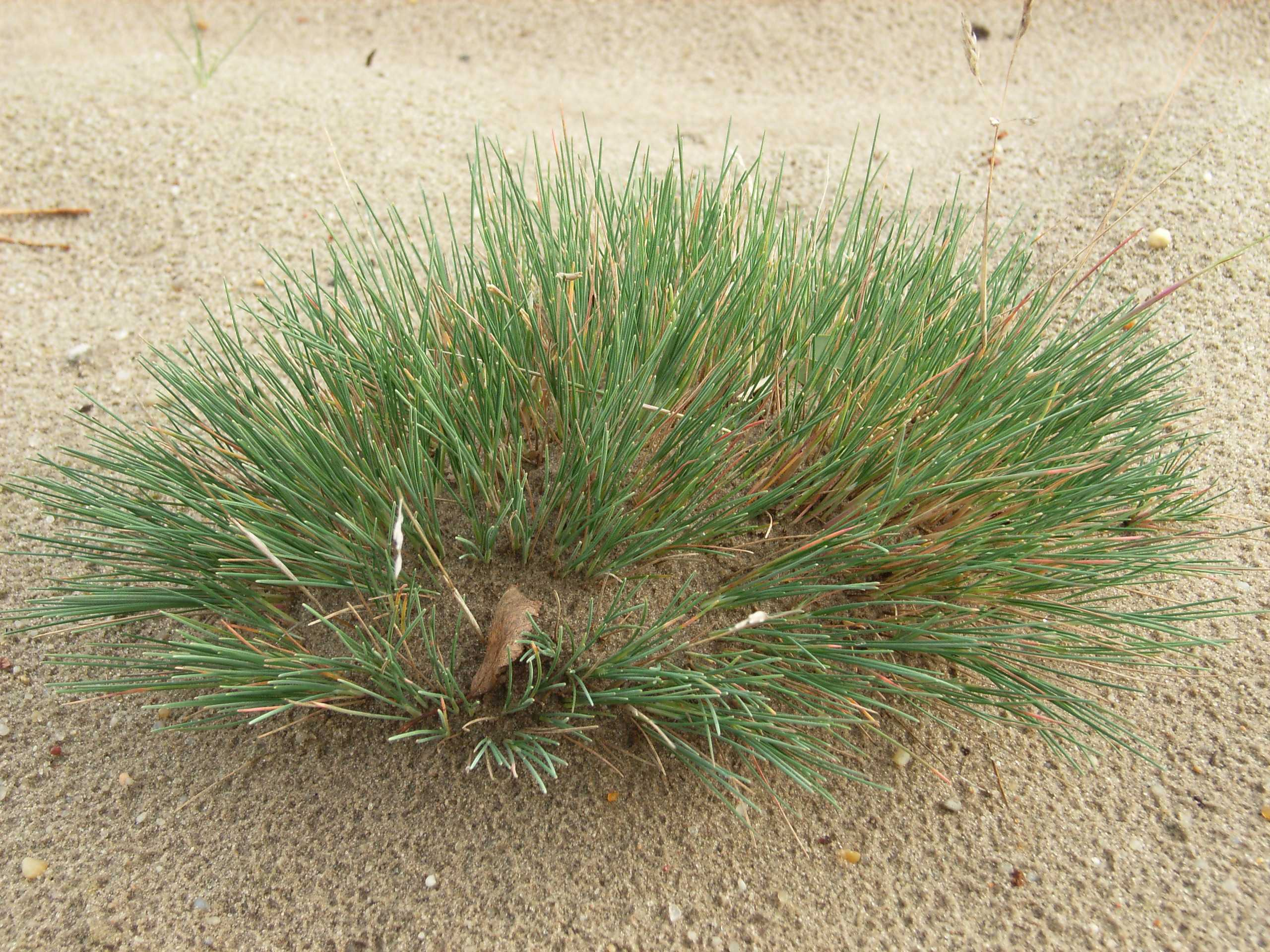

Scientific classification
- Kingdom: Plantae
- Clade: Tracheophytes
- Clade: Angiosperms
- Clade: Monocots
- Clade: Commelinids
- Order: Poales
- Family: Poaceae
- Subfamily: Pooideae
- Genus: Corynephorus
- Species: C. canescens

Binomial name
- Corynephorus canescens (L.) P.Beauv.

Synonyms
- Aira breviculmis Loisel.; Aira canescens L.; Aira triflora Willd. ex Steud.; Aira variegata St.-Amans; Agrostis canescens (L.) Salisb. not Griseb.; Avena canescens (L.) Weber; Corynephorus incanescens Bubani; Weingaertneria canescens (L.) Bernh.

= Corynephorus canescens =

Species of grass

Corynephorus canescens, common name grey hair-grass or gray clubawn grass, is a species of plants in the grass family, native to Europe, the Middle East, and North Africa but widely naturalized in North America. In the United Kingdom it is rare. It can be found at sites such as Wangford Warren and Carr, a Site of Special Scientific Interest in the Breckland area of Suffolk.

== Description ==
It has panicles which are 1.5–8 centimetres (0.59–3.15 in) long and 0.5–1.5 centimetres (0.20–0.59 in) wide. Its pedicels are 1–3 millimetres (0.039–0.118 in) in length while the leaf blades are 2–6 centimetres (0.79–2.36 in) long and 0.3–0.5 millimetres (0.012–0.020 in) wide. Both the upper and lower glumes are shiny, lanceolate, and membranous. The lemma have a dorsal awn and dentate apex with obscure lateral veins. Its fertile lemma is ovate, keelless, membranous and is 1.8–2.2 millimetres (0.071–0.087 in) long. The floret callus is hairy with rhachilla internodes being pilose. The flowers have three stamens which are 1.2–1.6 millimetres (0.047–0.063 in) long.
