= Wangford Warren and Carr =

Nature reserve in Suffolk, England

Coordinates: 52.42°N 0.58°E

- Site of Special Scientific Interest
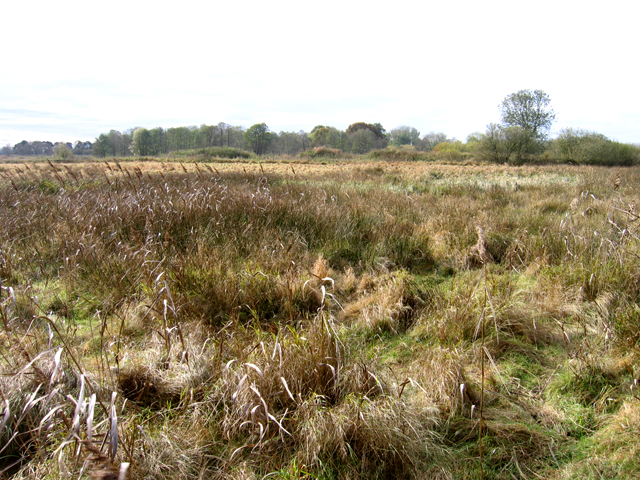
- Location of Wangford Warren and Carr.
- Area of search: Suffolk
- Grid reference: TL 755 839
- Interest: Biological
- Area: 67.8 hectares
- Notification date: 1985
- Location map: Magic Map

Wangford Warren and Carr is a 67.8-hectare (168-acre) biological Site of Special Scientific Interest between Brandon and Lakenheath in Suffolk. It is a Nature Conservation Review site, Grade I, and part of the Breckland Special Area of Conservation, and Special Protection Area An area of 15 hectares is managed as a nature reserve by the Suffolk Wildlife Trust

The site includes the "best preserved system of active sand dunes in Breckland". This habitat is described by the Joint Nature Conservation Committee as Inland dunes with open Corynephorus and Agrostis grasslands and is the only site of this kind in the United Kingdom. There is a range of habitats, including bare sand, Breckland heath and grasslands, fen, damp grassland and carr. Colonising species such as the rare grey hair-grass Corynephorus canescens, which is found at only three inland sites in England, and the moss Polytrichum piliferum are found in areas at Wangford Warren. At least nine different lichen species are found on the heath as well as a number of grass and heather species and plants such as gorse and hawthorn. The fen and carr areas include species such as purple moor grass Molinia cerulean, willow, alder and silver birch. The site is an example of colonization processes, showing the sequence from bare sand to heathland.

The Suffolk Wildlife Trust site is alongside the A1065 road. It has no visitor facilities and access is not allowed between March and August each year.
