= Lower Mill, Dalham =

Windmill in Dalham, Suffolk, England

Dalham Mill
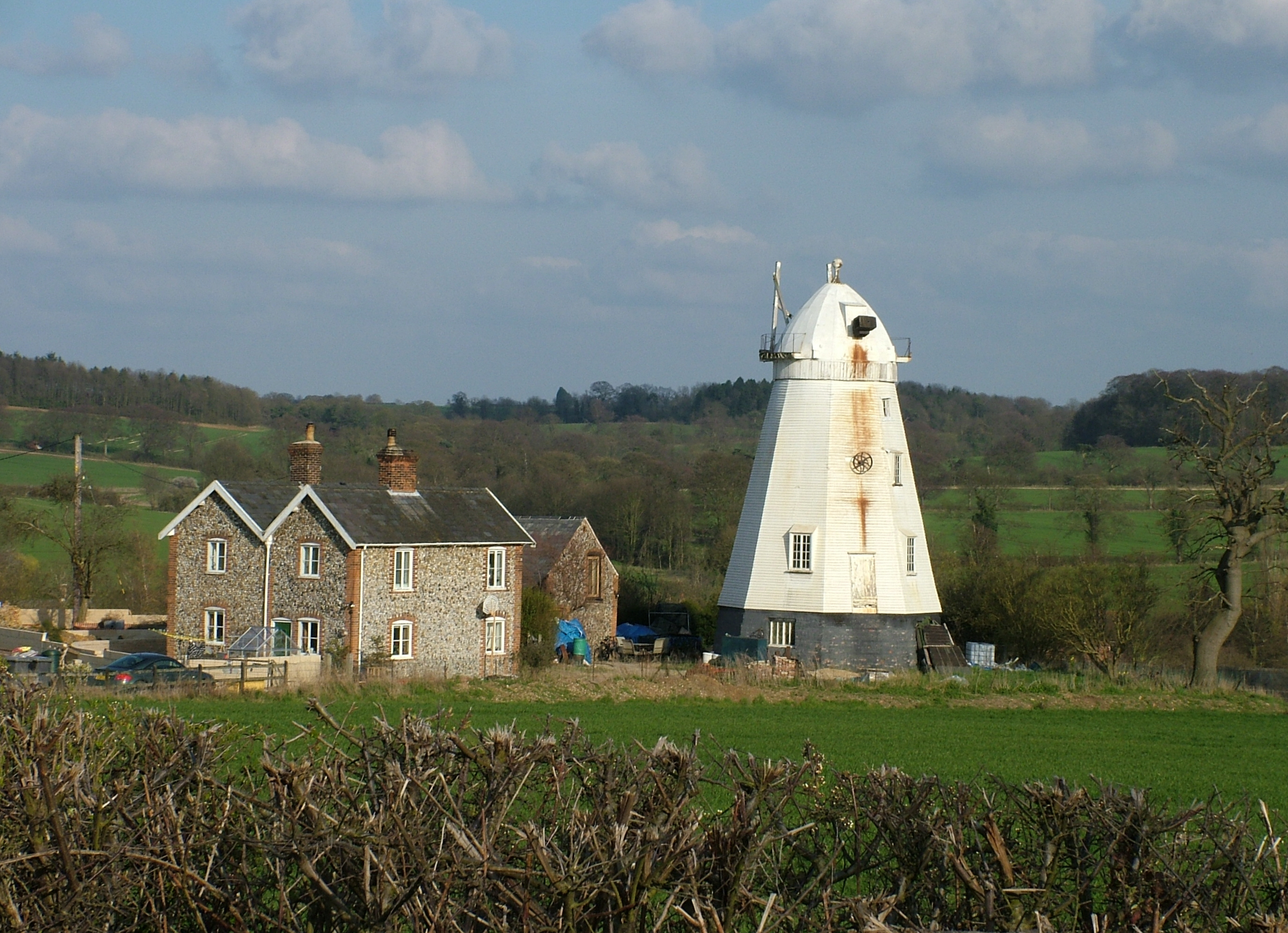
- Lower Mill, August 2005

Origin
- Mill name: Lower Mill, Opposition Mill
- Mill location: TL 719 617
- Coordinates: 52°13′36″N 0°31′04″E
- Operator(s): Private

Information
- Purpose: Corn mill
- Type: Smock mill
- Storeys: Three-storey smock
- Base storeys: One storey
- Smock sides: Eight sides
- No. of sails: Four Sails
- Type of sails: Patent sails
- Windshaft: Cast iron
- Winding: Fantail
- No. of pairs of millstones: Three pairs

Lower Mill or Opposition Mill is a Grade II* listed smock mill at Dalham, Suffolk, England which has been preserved.

== History ==
Lower Mill or Opposition Mill was built in the 1790s by a Mr Ruffle. The sails were blown off in 1802. She was working until 1926 and by 1935 was in need of repairs. These were completed in 1938 but the mill again deteriorated until it was purchased in 1972 by Frank Farrow and restoration began with the intention of returning the mill to working order, assisted by grants from Suffolk County Council and the Historic Buildings Council for England. The windmill's restoration work was carried out by Gormley and Goodman Engineers of Warwickshire between 1979 and 1980. (see also Bromham Watermill and Stevington Windmill, Bedfordshire.

== Description ==
Lower Mill is a three-storey smock mill on a single-storey brick base. It has a beehive cap with a gallery which was winded by a fantail. The four Patent sails were 27 feet (8.23 m) long and 7 feet (2.13 m) wide carried on a cast-iron windshaft. They drove three pairs of French Burr millstones which are mounted on a hurst frame on the first floor.

== Millers ==
- William Ruffle 1804-55
- George Moore 1855-75
- Abraham Simpson 1875-85
- Joseph Tabraham 1875-
- John Tabraham 1875-
- Josiah Tabraham
- John Tabraham
- Lewis Tabraham
- Elijah Rutterford 1904
- Charles Kerridge 1908
- Turner -1926

Reference for above:-
