= Elveden Hall =

Stately home in Suffolk, England

Coordinates: 52°23′07″N 0°40′47″E

Elveden Hall is a large stately home on the Elveden Estate in Elveden, Suffolk, England. The seat of the Earls of Iveagh, it is a Grade II* listed building. Located centrally to the village, it is close to the A11 and the parish church. As of 2026, it is owned by the 4th Earl of Iveagh.

== Early life of the house ==
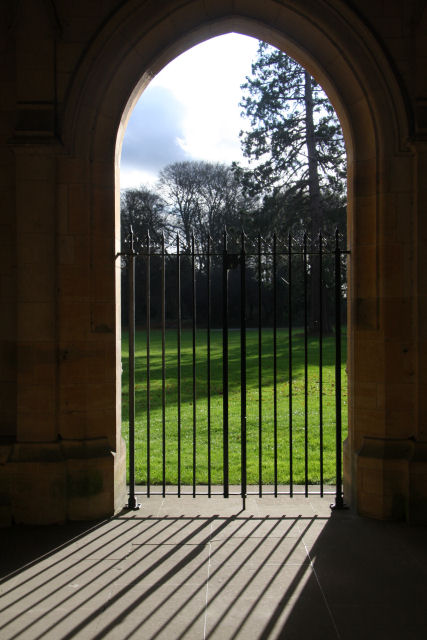
Gate leading to grounds of Elveden Hall

The date of the original house's construction is unknown but the estate is known to have been anciently appropriated by Bury St Edmunds Abbey. After the dissolution of the monasteries it was given by Henry VIII to the Duke of Norfolk. It subsequently passed through the ownerships of the Crisp and Tyrell families. The Georgian house at the core of the present house is thought to have been built c. 1760. In 1768 the estate was purchased by Admiral Augustus Keppel. He died without issue in 1796 and it passed to his nephew, the Earl of Albemarle, who sold it to MP William Newton in 1813.

== The Maharajah (1849–1894) ==
In 1849, the Maharajah Duleep Singh, the last true ruler of the Sikh Empire and owner of the famous Koh-i-Noor diamond was exiled to England, having been removed from his kingdom by the British East India Company.

The Maharajah purchased the 17,000-acre (6,900-hectare) Elveden Estate in 1863 and set about rebuilding the country house and dressing it in an Italian style. However, he redesigned the interior to resemble the Mughal palaces that he had been accustomed to in his childhood. He also augmented the building with an aviary where exotic birds such as golden pheasant, Icelandic gyrfalcons, parrots, peafowl and buzzards were kept. His architect was John Norton, the Gothic Revival specialist who also redesigned Tyntesfield. He lived under the watchful eye of the India Office at the estate with his family, wife Bamba Müller and their children who included Sophia Duleep Singh and Catherine Hilda Duleep Singh (who later became suffragettes), Bamba Duleep Singh and Frederick Duleep Singh.

Elveden Hall played host to a wide range of sporting activities but none rivalled the Maharajah's passion for shooting. His shooting parties were popular amongst aristocracy including Prince George, Duke of Cambridge.

After seasons of poor farming in the 1870s, a downturn in the Maharajah's personal fortunes and political tensions in government, the Maharajah left Elveden and England in 1886.

== The Earls of Iveagh (1894–present day) ==
The 1st Earl of Iveagh, of the Guinness brewing family, purchased the Elveden Estate in 1894 from the executors of the will of the Maharajah Duleep Singh following his death in 1893.

The Hall was used during the Second World War as a headquarters for the USAAF, during which time the staff quarters were struck and destroyed by a bomb. By the 1980s, the Guinness family were living elsewhere on the estate, and the Hall occupied by caretakers. Its entire contents, including elaborate items owned by the Maharajah, were auctioned at Christie's in May 1984.

The Elveden Estate continues to be one of the country's largest farms. In 2000, in possibly the biggest case of fly-tipping in British history, over one million tyres and a thousand tonnes of shredded rubber were dumped on its land, the removal of which cost several hundred thousand pounds.

Owners of Elveden Hall and its estate since 1894 have been:

- Edward Cecil Guinness, 1st Earl of Iveagh (1894–1927)
- Rupert Edward Cecil Lee Guinness, 2nd Earl of Iveagh (1927–1967)
- Arthur Francis Benjamin Guinness, 3rd Earl of Iveagh (1967–1992)
- Arthur Edward Rory Guinness, 4th Earl of Iveagh (since 1992)

The heir apparent is the present holder's son Arthur Benjamin Geoffrey Guinness, Viscount Elveden (b. 2003)

== Filming location ==
Elveden Hall's unique and impressive architecture and surrounding landscapes have been used for filming on a number of occasions. These films include:

- The Living Daylights (1987)
- Gulliver's Travels (1996) TV / DVD
- The Moonstone (1997)
- Eyes Wide Shut (1999)
- Lara Croft: Tomb Raider (2001)
- Stardust (2007)
- Dean Spanley (2008)
- Agatha Christie's Poirot: Cat Among the Pigeons (2008)
- All the Money in the World (2017)
- Heart of Stone (2023)

== See also ==
- Guinness Baronets, of Ashford
- Baron Moyne
- Guinness family
- Princess Bamba Sutherland

== Sources ==
- Kidd, Charles & Williamson, David (editors). Debrett's Peerage and Baronetage (1990 edition). New York: St Martin's Press, 1990.
- Bance, Peter. The Duleep Singhs: The Photographic Album of Queen Victoria's Maharajah: Photo Album of Queen Victoria's Maharajah (2004) Sutton Publishing, 2004.
- Leigh Rayment's Peerage Page
- Edward Cecil Guinness
