= Benjamin Guinness, 3rd Earl of Iveagh =

Irish businessman and politician (1937–1992)

The Right Honourable The Earl of Iveagh

Member of the House of Lords
- Lord Temporal
- In office 7 October 1967 – 18 June 1992
- Preceded by: The 2nd Earl of Iveagh
- Succeeded by: The 4th Earl of Iveagh

Senator
- In office 1 June 1973 – 27 October 1977
- Constituency: Nominated by the Taoiseach

Personal details
- Born: Arthur Francis Benjamin Guinness; 20 May 1937
- Died: 18 June 1992 (aged 55)
- Party: Fine Gael (Ireland)
- Spouse: Miranda Smiley (m. 1963; div. 1984)
- Children: 4
- Education: Trinity College, Cambridge; University of Grenoble

Arthur Francis Benjamin Guinness, 3rd Earl of Iveagh (20 May 1937 – 18 June 1992), styled Viscount Elveden between 1945 and 1967, was an Irish businessman and politician. He was chairman of Guinness plc from 1962 to 1986, and then its president from 1986 until his death in 1992.

== Biography ==
Lord Iveagh (often commonly known as Benjamin Iveagh) was born into the Anglo-Irish Guinness family, being the son of Arthur Onslow Edward Guinness, Viscount Elveden, and Lady Elizabeth Cecilia Hare, daughter of Richard Hare, 4th Earl of Listowel. His father, Viscount Elveden, was a Major in the 55th (Suffolk and Norfolk Yeomanry) Anti-Tank Regiment of the Royal Artillery and was killed in action by a V-2 rocket while serving in Belgium on 8 February 1945. In 1947, his mother remarried Edward Rory More O'Ferrall, from another aristocratic Irish family.

Lord Iveagh was educated at Eton College, Trinity College, Cambridge, and the University of Grenoble. He inherited the title from his grandfather, The 2nd Earl of Iveagh, in September 1967. He lived at Farmleigh in the Phoenix Park in Dublin and was chairman of Guinness from 1961 to 1992. He was a trustee of two charitable housing associations, the Iveagh Trust in Dublin and the Guinness Trust in London. He was involved in horse breeding and also owned horses. The More O'Ferralls, his mother's husband's family were prominent in racing and breeding circles. He helped to finance the Kildangan Stud, a famous stud farm owned by his step-uncle, Roderic More O'Ferrall.

Uniquely at the time, he was a member of two upper houses in two different countries simultaneously. He was in the British House of Lords from 1967 to 1992 and served in Seanad Éireann on the nomination of Liam Cosgrave from 1973 to 1977.

Towards the end of his life, Guinness was an alcoholic.

His obituary in The Independent, described his business career as "at best undistinguished and at times positively disastrous ...[h]is reign [as chairman of Guinness] was marked first by a phase of unbridled diversification away from the core brewing business and then a prolonged period of debilitating decline."

== Personal life and family ==
Lord Iveagh married Miranda Daphne Jane Smiley, daughter of Major Michael Smiley, of Castle Fraser, Kemnay, Aberdeenshire, on 12 March 1963. They had four children before their divorce in 1984:

1. Lady Emma Lavinia (born 7 December 1963), who lives at Parham House, Pulborough, and serves as Lord Lieutenant of West Sussex
2. Lady Louisa Jane (born 20 February 1967)
3. Edward Guinness, 4th Earl of Iveagh (born 25 August 1969)
4. Hon. Rory Michael Benjamin Guinness (born 12 December 1974)

Lord Iveagh died of cancer in Kensington and Chelsea, London, in 1992 at the age of 55. His eldest son succeeded to the family titles.

== Arms ==
Coat of arms of Benjamin Guinness, 3rd Earl of Iveagh
Earl of Iveagh	Adopted 30 September 1919 Coronet A Coronet of an Earl Crest 1st: A Boar passant quarterly Or and Gules; 2nd: On a Pillar Argent encircled by a Ducal Coronet Or an Eagle preying on a Bird's Leg erased proper Escutcheon Quarterly: 1st and 4th, Per saltire Gules and Azure a Lion rampant Or on a Chief Ermine a Dexter Hand couped at the wrist of the first (Guinness); 2nd and 3rd, Argent on a Fess between three Crescents Sable a Trefoil slipped Or (Lee) Supporters On either side a Stag Gules collared gemel and attired Or each resting a hind hoof upon an Escutcheon Vert charged with a Lion rampant Or Motto Spes Mea In Deo (My hope is in God)

Peerage of the United Kingdom
Preceded by Rupert Guinness	Earl of Iveagh; 1967–1992	Succeeded by Edward Guinness
