= Santon Downham =

Village in Suffolk, England

Coordinates: 52.4566°N 0.6679°E

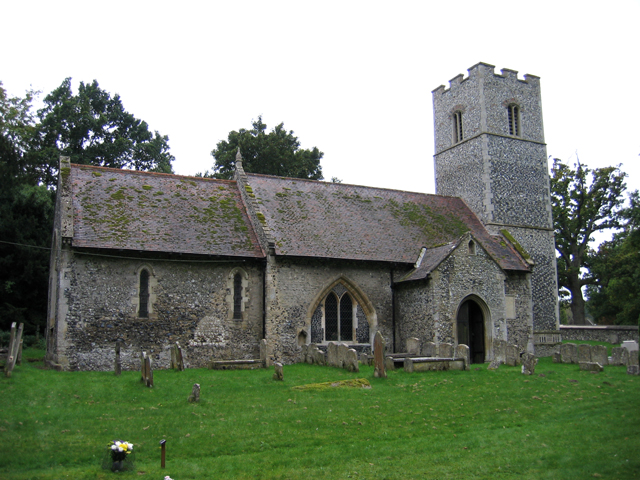
- Church of St Mary

- Location within Suffolk
- Population: 237 (2011)
- District: West Suffolk
- Shire county: Suffolk
- Region: East
- Country: England
- Sovereign state: United Kingdom
- Post town: Brandon
- Postcode district: IP27
- Dialling code: 01842
- Police: Suffolk
- Fire: Suffolk
- Ambulance: East of England
- UK Parliament: West Suffolk

Santon Downham is a village and civil parish in the West Suffolk district of Suffolk in eastern England. In 2005 it had a population of 240. The village is located within Thetford Forest on a meander of the River Little Ouse on the Norfolk-Suffolk border. Thetford is 4 miles (6 km) southeast and the nearest railway station is in Brandon 2 miles (3 km) west.

== History ==
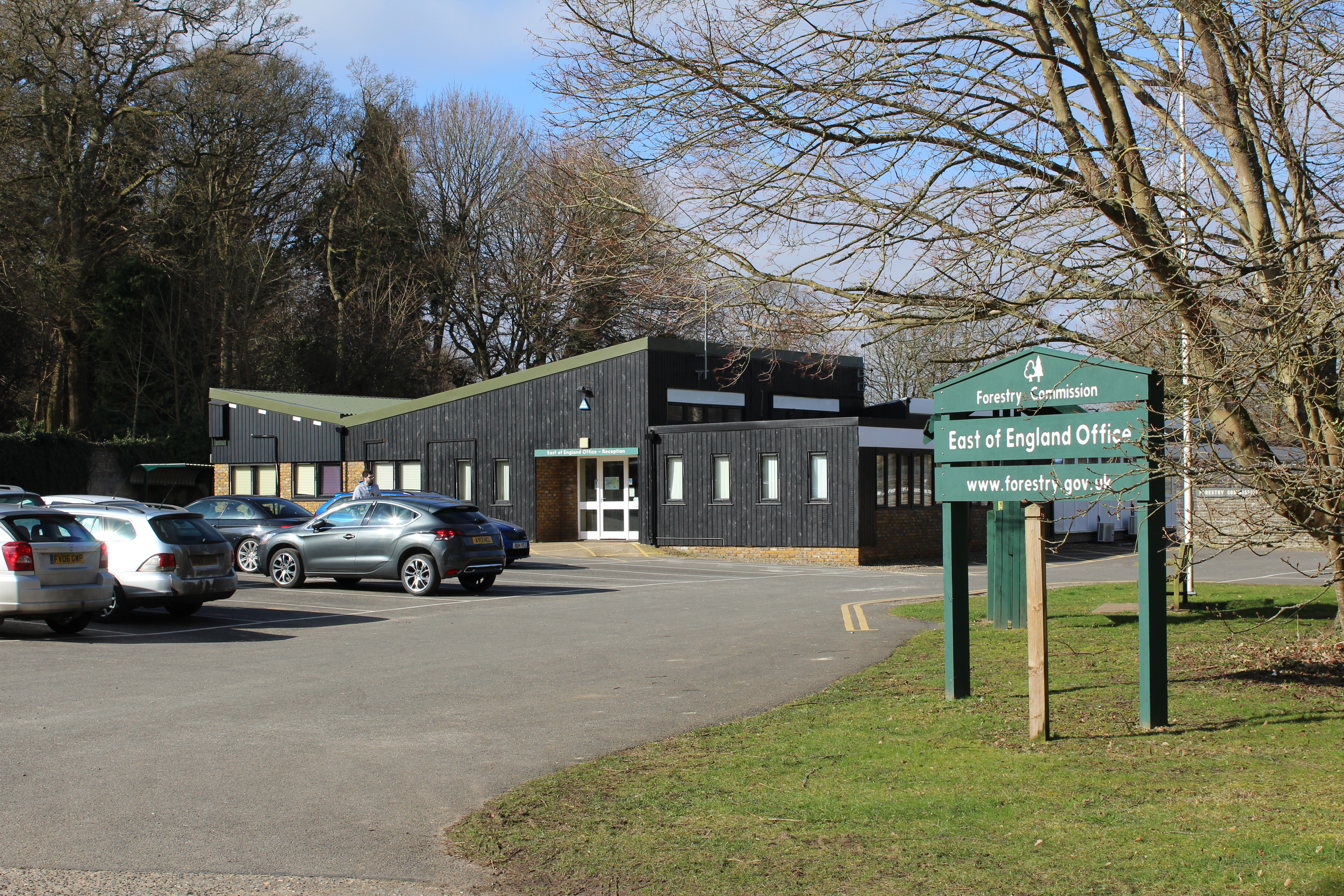
East of England Forestry Commission offices

The village was the administrative centre for the Eastern Forestry Commission for many years, following the planting of tens of thousands of trees in the Breckland to form the Thetford Forest. The District office and staff were housed in a 1960s office building close to the site of the now-demolished Downham Hall. The Hall garden formed the base for the nursery department of the district. The Forestry Commission repair depot was built close by in an award-winning building, next to which stood the Forestry Commission fire station. A Bedford 'Green Goddess' fire tender and a water tanker were kept in the fire station due to the high fire risk in the area.

In 1972 the bridge over the River Little Ouse appeared in programme 50 of the fifth series of BBC's sitcom Dad's Army, when Captain Mainwaring and his troops attempt to demolish it.

== Climate ==
Santon Downham has an oceanic climate (Köppen: Cfb).

The highest temperature since records began in 1959 was 39.0 °C (102.2 °F) on 19 July 2022 and the lowest was −18.9 °C (−2.0 °F) on 23 January 1963.

Santon Downham is a known frost hollow and holds the record for the coldest temperature ever recorded in the UK in June, a low of −5.6 °C (21.9 °F) on 1 and 3 June 1962, a record it also shares with Dalwhinnie in the highlands of Scotland. Temperatures also dipped to −5.6 °C (21.9 °F) on 30 September 1969, which is one of the coldest September nights recorded in the UK. The temperature can go below freezing at any time of the year.

Climate data for Santon Downham (1991–2020 normals, extremes 1959-present)
Month	Jan	Feb	Mar	Apr	May	Jun	Jul	Aug	Sep	Oct	Nov	Dec	Year
Record high °C (°F)	16.7 (62.1)	19.4 (66.9)	25.0 (77.0)	28.2 (82.8)	34.5 (94.1)	37.3 (99.1)	39.0 (102.2)	35.8 (96.4)	31.7 (89.1)	29.3 (84.7)	18.8 (65.8)	16.0 (60.8)	39.0 (102.2)
Mean daily maximum °C (°F)	7.8 (46.0)	8.5 (47.3)	11.2 (52.2)	14.4 (57.9)	17.7 (63.9)	20.4 (68.7)	22.9 (73.2)	22.6 (72.7)	19.5 (67.1)	15.2 (59.4)	10.9 (51.6)	8.0 (46.4)	15.0 (59.0)
Daily mean °C (°F)	4.3 (39.7)	4.6 (40.3)	6.4 (43.5)	8.8 (47.8)	11.9 (53.4)	14.8 (58.6)	17.1 (62.8)	16.8 (62.2)	14.1 (57.4)	10.7 (51.3)	6.9 (44.4)	4.5 (40.1)	10.1 (50.2)
Mean daily minimum °C (°F)	0.8 (33.4)	0.7 (33.3)	1.7 (35.1)	3.2 (37.8)	6.1 (43.0)	9.2 (48.6)	11.3 (52.3)	11.1 (52.0)	8.7 (47.7)	6.1 (43.0)	3.0 (37.4)	1.0 (33.8)	5.3 (41.5)
Record low °C (°F)	−18.9 (−2.0)	−15.0 (5.0)	−12.2 (10.0)	−9.7 (14.5)	−7.7 (18.1)	−5.6 (21.9)	−1.1 (30.0)	−1.7 (28.9)	−5.6 (21.9)	−8.7 (16.3)	−11.1 (12.0)	−16.1 (3.0)	−18.9 (−2.0)
Average precipitation mm (inches)	54.4 (2.14)	44.3 (1.74)	45.5 (1.79)	40.7 (1.60)	46.9 (1.85)	60.1 (2.37)	58.8 (2.31)	65.2 (2.57)	55.1 (2.17)	67.3 (2.65)	65.9 (2.59)	62.1 (2.44)	666.3 (26.23)
Average precipitation days (≥ 1.0 mm)	11.2	10.4	9.5	8.9	8.5	9.5	9.5	9.6	9.0	10.7	11.9	11.8	120.5
Mean monthly sunshine hours	50.1	75.9	108.0	162.3	198.0	186.2	198.9	190.9	135.4	103.6	63.5	53.9	1,526.7
Source 1: Met Office
Source 2: Starlings Roost Weather

== Transport ==
The Santon Downham Tramway was a 3.7-mile (6 km) long narrow-gauge railway, which was operated around 1918 to 1922.

== See also ==
- Santon, Norfolk, a nearby depopulated village
