= Elveden =

Village in Suffolk, England

Coordinates: 52.387°N 0.676°E

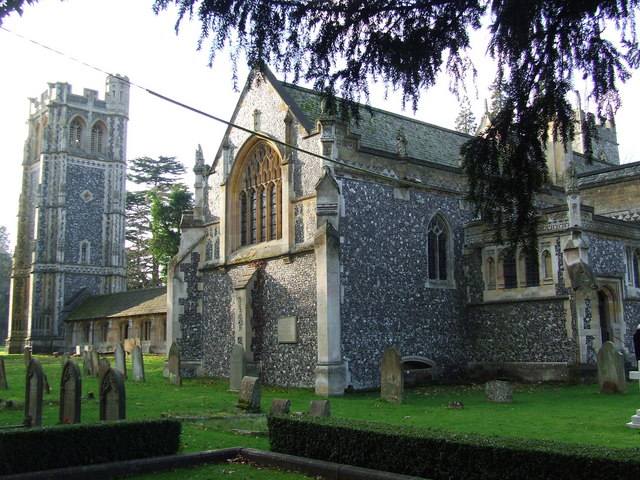
- St Andrew and St Patrick Church, Elveden

- Location within Suffolk
- Population: 270 (2005); 254 (2011)
- District: West Suffolk
- Shire county: Suffolk
- Region: East
- Country: England
- Sovereign state: United Kingdom
- Post town: Thetford
- Postcode district: IP24
- Dialling code: 01842
- Police: Suffolk
- Fire: Suffolk
- Ambulance: East of England
- UK Parliament: West Suffolk

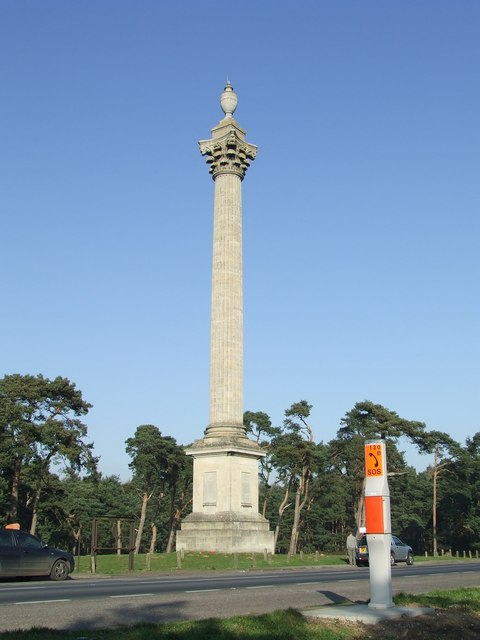
Elveden War Memorial, close to the A11, is 127 feet (39 m) tall.

Elveden is a village and civil parish in the West Suffolk district of Suffolk in eastern England. In 2005 it had a population of 270. The village is bypassed by the A11 between Cambridge and Norwich, which ran through the centre of the village prior to 2014.

== Etymology ==
The name Elveden seems to come from Old English *ælfa-dene 'elves' valley': the name appears, translated into Latin, as vallis nympharum 'valley of nymphs' in the mid-12th-century Miracula sancte Wihtburge. During the 17th and 18th centuries, the village was often referred to as Elden.

== Tourism ==
Elveden Hall is the centrepiece of the Elveden Estate, a vast country estate that is now the family seat of the Anglo-Irish Guinness family, Earls of Iveagh. Formerly, it was the family home of Maharaja Duleep Singh, who is buried in the churchyard of St Andrew and St Patrick Church; his grave is visited by the Sikh community who pay homage to the last ruler of the Sikh Empire. A Center Parcs holiday complex straddles the northern limit of the parish at Elveden Forest.

== Elveden War Memorial ==
The Elveden War Memorial is a war memorial initially erected to the First World War dead. It honours the fallen from Eriswell, Icklingham and Elveden, and is situated at the meeting point of these three parishes. The names of the dead of each parish are listed separately on three of the sides of the column's base. To the original First World War listings there are also Second World War additions. The fourth (NW) side has a locked door that is used to access the inside of the column and via a spiral staircase to get to the upper parts of the monument. Small slits in the column's sides are used to light its interior and can be easily seen from the outside.

It is a Corinthian column 127 feet (39 m) tall, made of Weldon Stone and surmounted by an urn of Portland stone. Edward Cecil Guinness, owner of Elveden, commissioned the architect Clyde Francis Young to design and build the column, which took 2 years to erect and was completed in 1921. It was listed in 1954 and is now a Grade II* listed structure.

War monuments of this type and height are rare, and it is thought that the design was inspired by the 120 feet (37 m) Coke Column or Leicester Monument which is located at the Holkham estate in north Norfolk.

It is close to the A11, where there is a lay-by which can be used to visit the site.

== Name appropriation ==
Operations "Elveden" and (coincidentally nearby) "Weeting" were investigations surrounding the News of the World-implicated phone hacking allegations in July 2011. It was specifically that arising from the allegations of bribes or offers of bribes to the police, for third parties' private conversation details.
