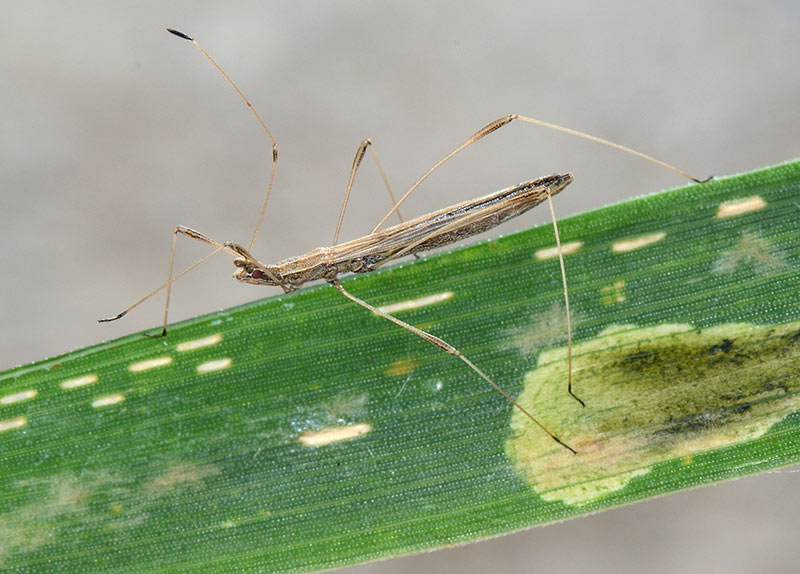

Scientific classification
- Domain: Eukaryota
- Kingdom: Animalia
- Phylum: Arthropoda
- Class: Insecta
- Order: Hemiptera
- Suborder: Heteroptera
- Family: Berytidae
- Genus: Neides
- Species: N. tipularius

Binomial name
- Neides tipularius (Linnaeus, 1758)

= Neides tipularius =

Species of true bug

Neides tipularius is a Palearctic stilt bug. It occurs from the Northern Mediterranean to Scandinavia and the British Isles. Further east it is found in Asia minor and the Caucasus to Central Asia. In Germany and the Alps it is widespread and not uncommon. In Britain it is locally common in large parts of the South. In Ireland it is rare.

Adults are 9.5 to 11.5 mm long. They are drab grey-brown or straw coloured and easily recognizable by their slender elongate bodies and very long legs. The similar representatives of the genus Berytinus are smaller and have a much shorter second antennal segment. The hemielytra are always fully developed. Nymphs are colored green.

Neides tipularius feeds on various herbaceous plants such as Cerastium, Arenaria, Silene, various Caryophyllaceae, Erodium, Geraniaceae and others. The imagines also feed on grasses (Poaceae such as Corynephorus and Agrostis. They are associated with dry, sandy soils and coastal dunes.
