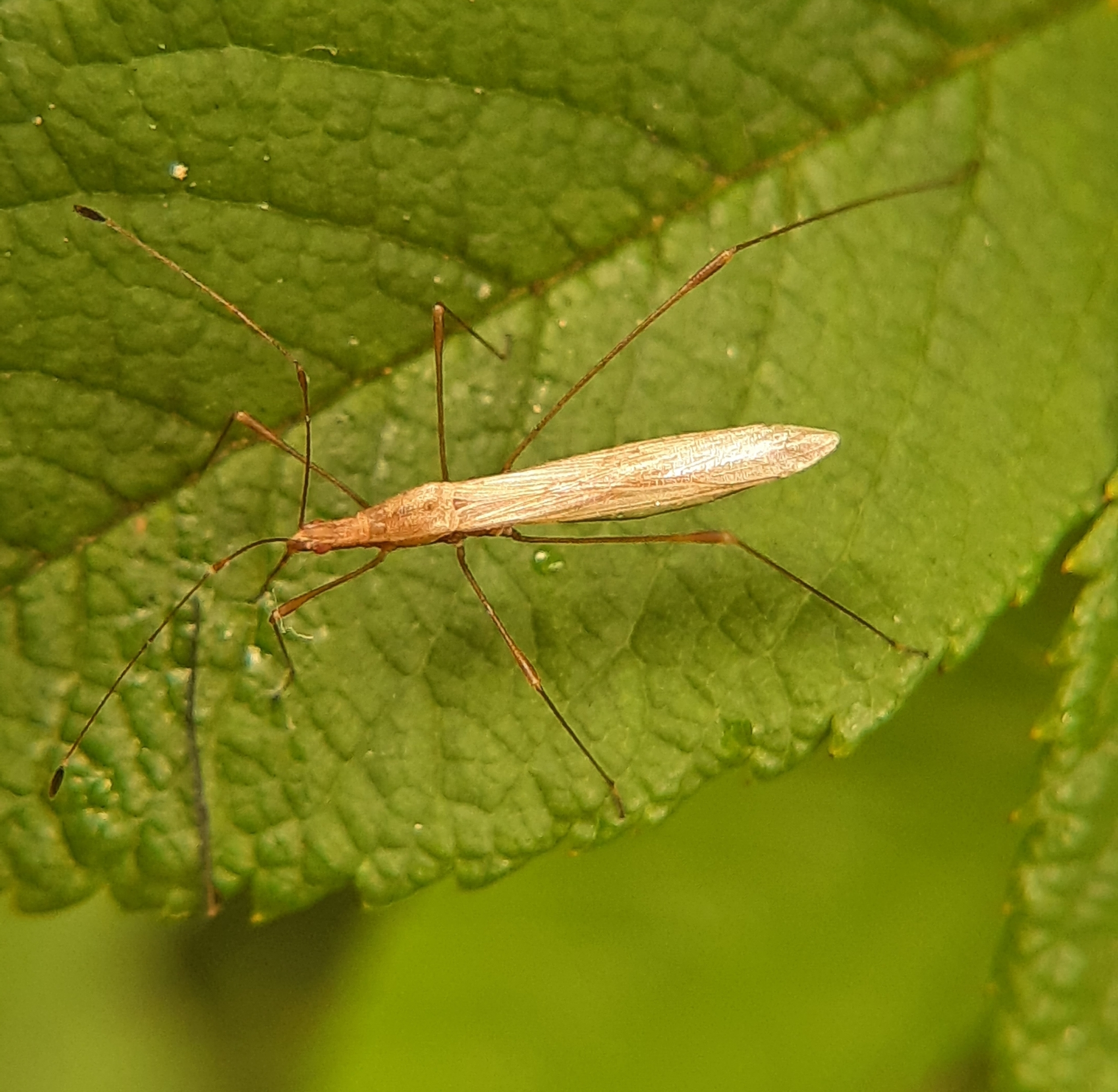
- Neoneides muticus, Canada

Scientific classification
- Kingdom: Animalia
- Phylum: Arthropoda
- Clade: Pancrustacea
- Class: Insecta
- Order: Hemiptera
- Suborder: Heteroptera
- Family: Berytidae
- Subfamily: Berytinae
- Genus: Neoneides
- Species: N. muticus

Binomial name
- Neoneides muticus (Say, 1832)

= Neoneides muticus =

Species of stilt bug

Neoneides muticus is a species of stilt bug in the family Berytidae, found in North America.
