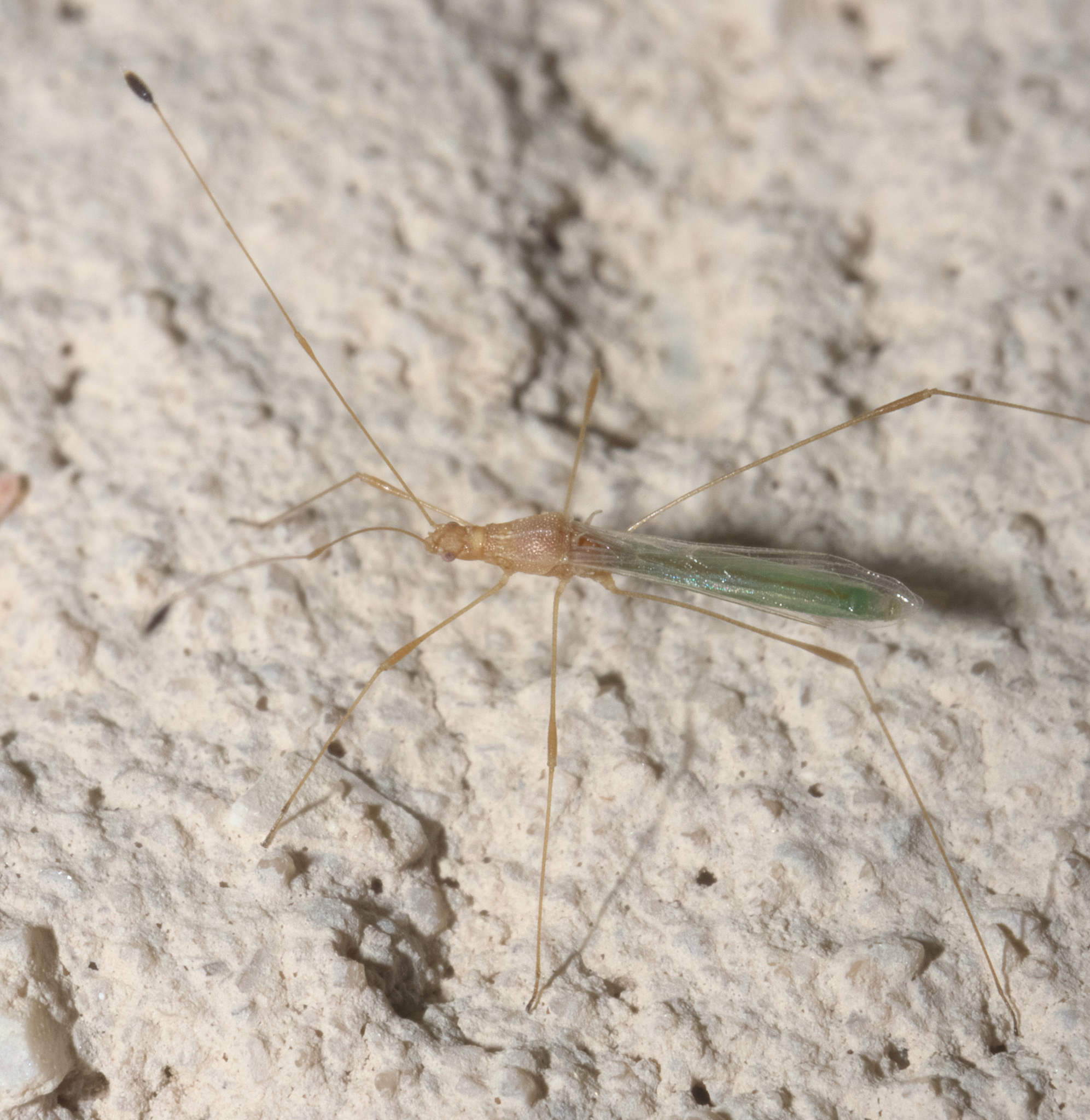
- Metacanthus multispinus, Texas

Scientific classification
- Domain: Eukaryota
- Kingdom: Animalia
- Phylum: Arthropoda
- Class: Insecta
- Order: Hemiptera
- Suborder: Heteroptera
- Family: Berytidae
- Subfamily: Metacanthinae
- Genus: Metacanthus
- Species: M. multispinus

Binomial name
- Metacanthus multispinus (Ashmead, 1887)

= Metacanthus multispinus =

Species of true bug

Metacanthus multispinus is a species of stilt bug in the family Berytidae. It is found in the Caribbean Sea, Central America, North America, and South America.
