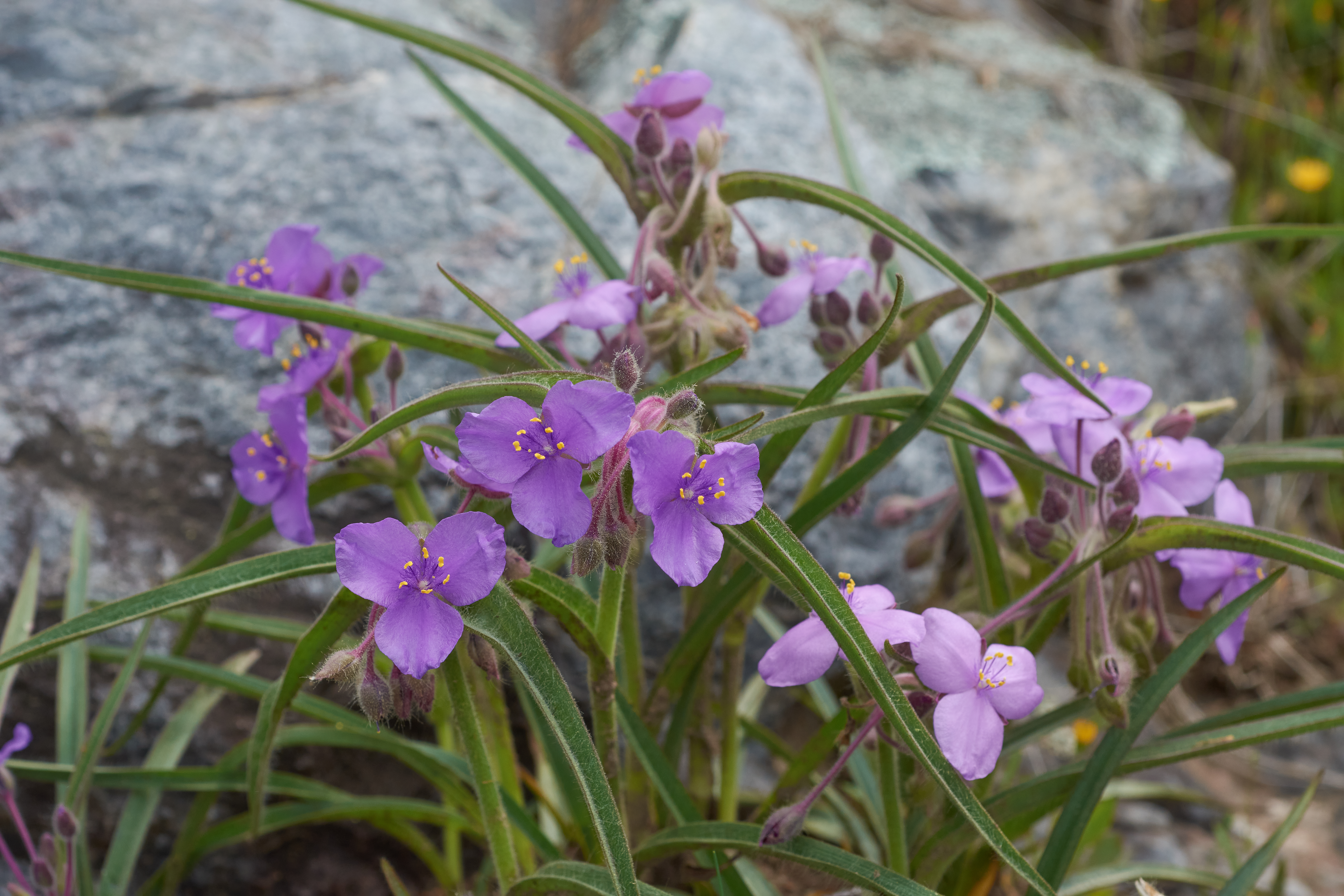
- Several individuals of the species in Arkansas.

Conservation status
- Near Threatened (IUCN 3.1)

Scientific classification
- Kingdom: Plantae
- Clade: Tracheophytes
- Clade: Angiosperms
- Clade: Monocots
- Clade: Commelinids
- Order: Commelinales
- Family: Commelinaceae
- Genus: Tradescantia
- Species: T. hirsuticaulis

Binomial name
- Tradescantia hirsuticaulis Small

= Tradescantia hirsuticaulis =

Species of plant

Tradescantia hirsuticaulis, the Hairystem Spiderwort, Hairy-stem Spiderwort, or Hairy-stemmed Spiderworth is a perennial herb belonging to the Commelinaceae family. Native to the Southeastern United States, the herb most commonly grows between rocks and in dry, shaded woods. The species grows close to the ground and produces purple flowers during late spring and early summer.

John Kunkel Small designated it as a species in 1897 while segregating various Tradescantia plants to solve inconsistent classifications. When in contact with humans and multiple animal species, T. hirsuticaulis can cause contact dermititis.

== Etymology ==
Carl Linnaeus chose the name for the genus after John Tradescant the Elder and John Tradescant the Younger, two leading botanists in 17th-century England. This naming came after the younger Tradescant brought back what became Tradescantia virginium from Virginia following trips to the colony in the 1630s.

The word hirsuticaulis comes from a combination of latin words: hirsut and caulis. "Hirsut" translates to hair, while "caul" translates to stem, which are together indicative of the small hairs that grow along the plant's stem. The term "spiderwort" that is used in several of the plant's common names refers to the silky, fine threads of secretion that T. hirsuticaulis releases after its stem is cut.

== Distribution and habitat ==
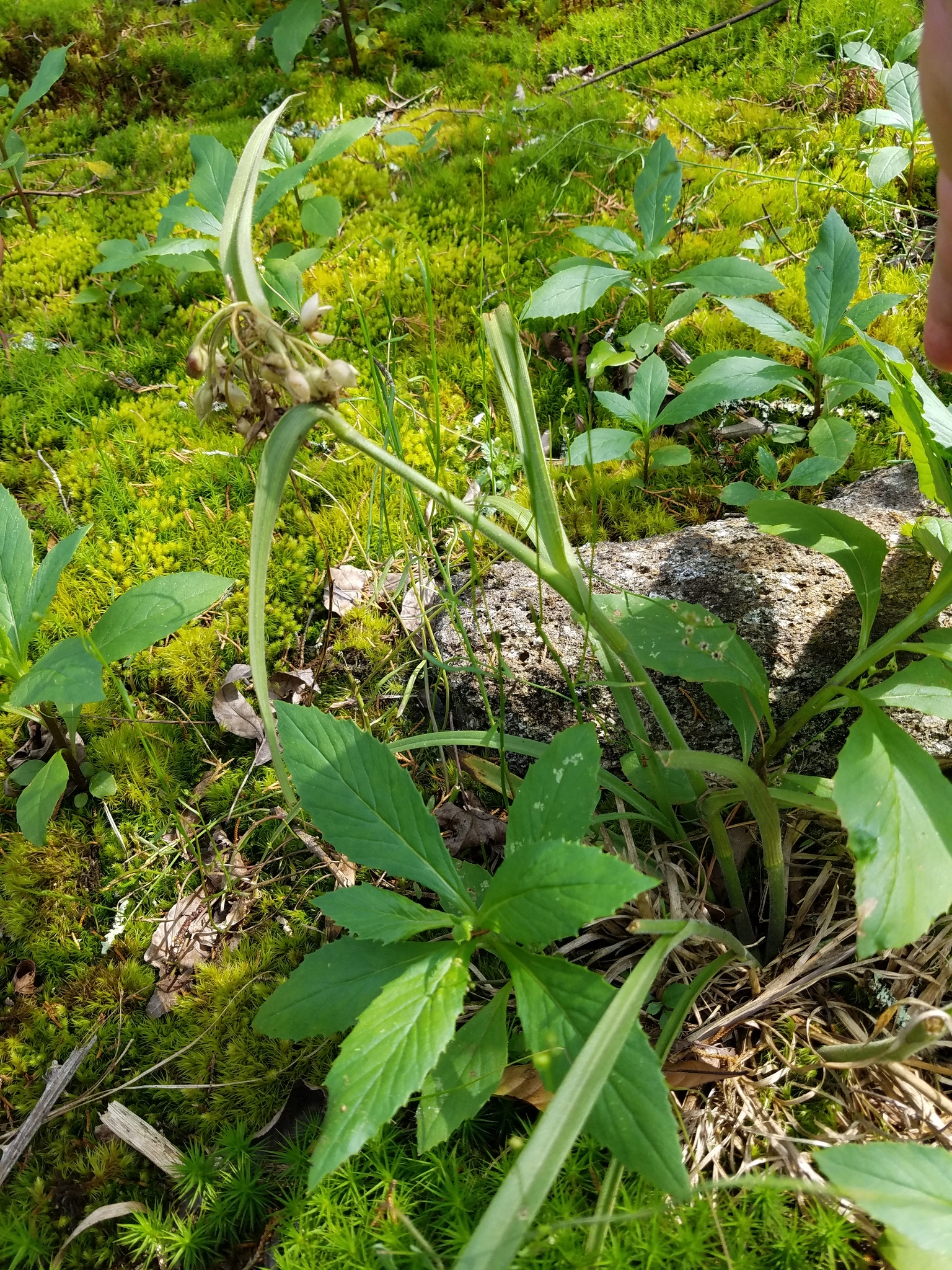
Unflowered T. hirsuticaulis in its native environment

T. hirsuticaulis is most frequently found in the Southeastern United States. Its native range reaches as far west as Eastern Oklahoma and Texas and as far east as Georgia and the North Carolina Piedmont region. The species is most commonly found in Alabama, Arkansas, Georgia, North Carolina, Oklahoma, South Carolina, and Tennessee. The Tennessee populations are generally located throughout the state's Giles, Hickman, and Lawrence counties. Two separate individuals are known to have grown outside the plant's normal range in Pennsylvania and Bolivia. The method by which these plants ended up in those locations is unknown.

The populations that exist in its native range are often scattered, but very populated. The plant tends to thrive in these areas due to the existence of dry woods and rocky places within which it can grow. It also grows best within dry soils of poorer quality and in partial shade, which are all common features throughout the Southeastern United States.

=== Conservation ===
T. hirsuticaulis as a species is considered near threatened at a global level. In Mississippi, however, there only exist fewer than 1,000 individuals. Further north in North and South Carolina, the plant is imperiled and vulnerable, respectively. The large geographic dispersion of many populations threatens the long term survival of T. hirsuticaulis. This relative isolation limits the gene flow between populations, suggesting that if populations are destroyed, there is a large threat to the evolution and survival of the species.

== Description ==
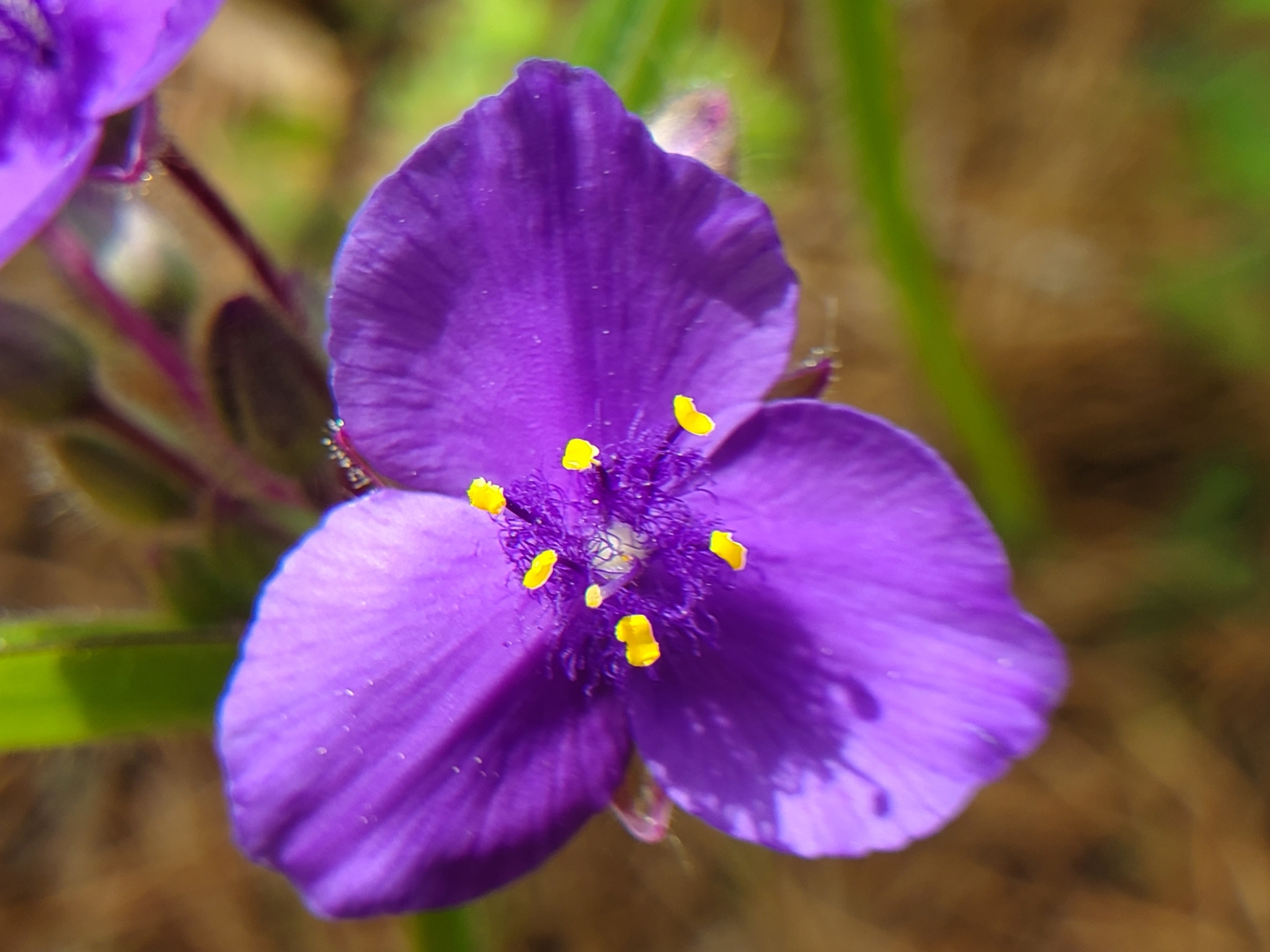
A flower of T. hirsuticaulis

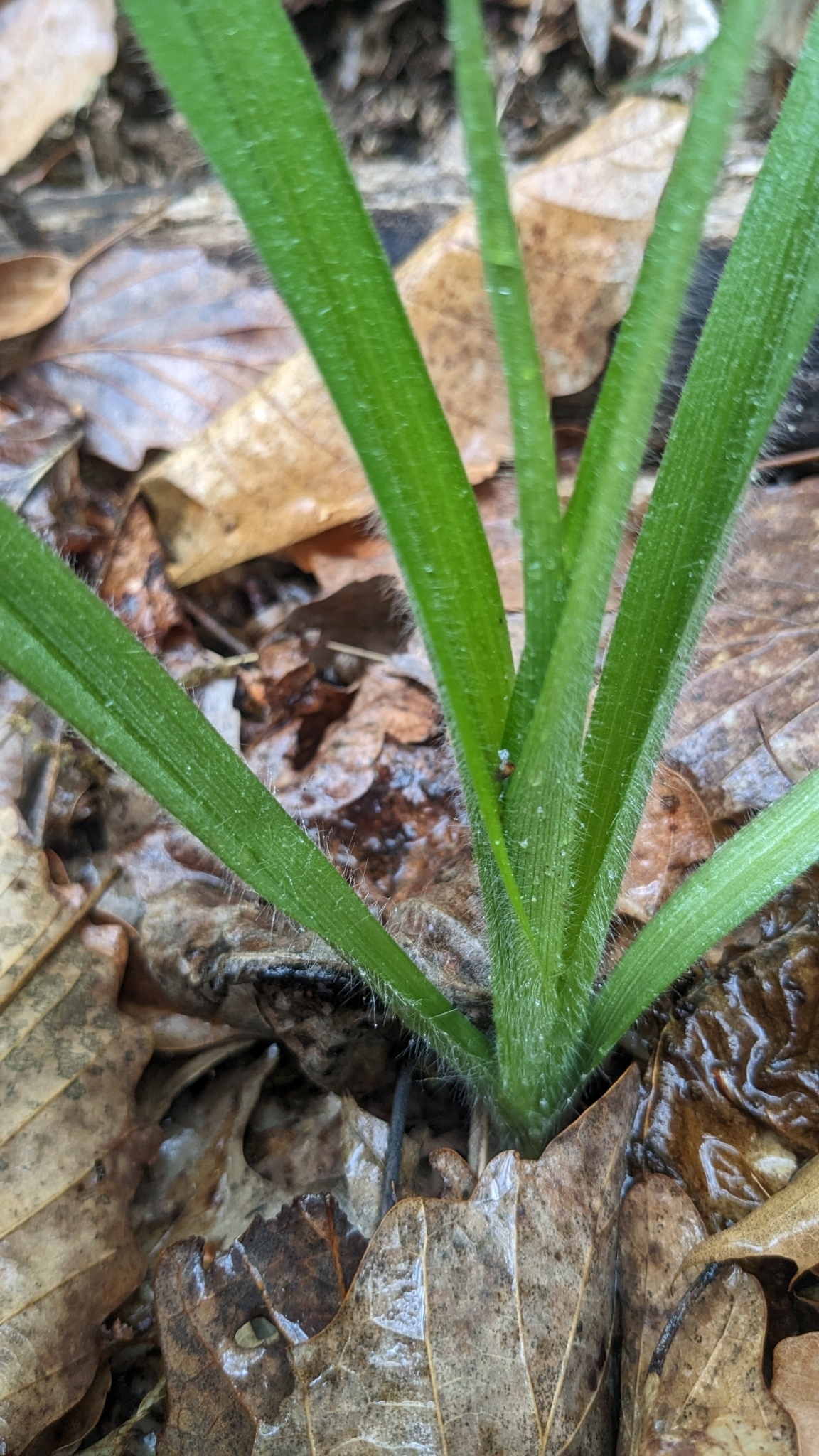
The hairy stem of T. hirsuticaulis.

T. hirsuticaulis can grow up to 40 cm tall but can be as low as 15 cm. The plant's leaves are attached directly to the stem at its base and are spirally arranged around the stem. The leaves are a dull green with a linear or lanceolate shape and measure 10–30 cm long and 0.6–1.6 cm wide. The leaf width is wider at its base and narrow with distance. They can have densely ciliolate or sparsely ciliate margins with a pointed apex and are often covered with both puberulent and pilose hairs. They are deciduous and the plant sheds its leaves once a year. The species' flowers are purple and have actinomorphic symmetry. Each flower has a pedicel covered with glandular and non-glandular trichomes measuring 1.5–3.5 cm. Flowers mostly have 3 petals and are roughly 1 inch in diameter. There are 6 stamens per flower, each of which is polyandrous. T. hirsuticaulis' flowers also contain bearded filaments. The petals are ovate, do not contain claws, and are 11–16 mm in length. The sepals beneath the petals are tinted red or purple and are covered with both glandular and non-glandular trichomes. These hairs often measure between 1.5 mm and 16 mm. The inflorescences are mainly terminal, though occasionally axillary. They tend to be puberulent and pilose and have foliaceous bracts with ciliolate margins.

The fruit is a dry, brown capsule formed shortly after flowering. Flowering and fruit formation generally occur between late spring and early summer. The seeds measure 2–3 mm and have a hilum that extends vertically across the seeds and are subject to dehiscence.

The stems are unbranched or sparsely branched, and can be erect or descending. T. hirsuticaulis often has internodes that are either pilose or glabrescent. Beneath the species' stems, its roots are brown and covered with tomentum.

== Ecology ==
=== Pollination ===
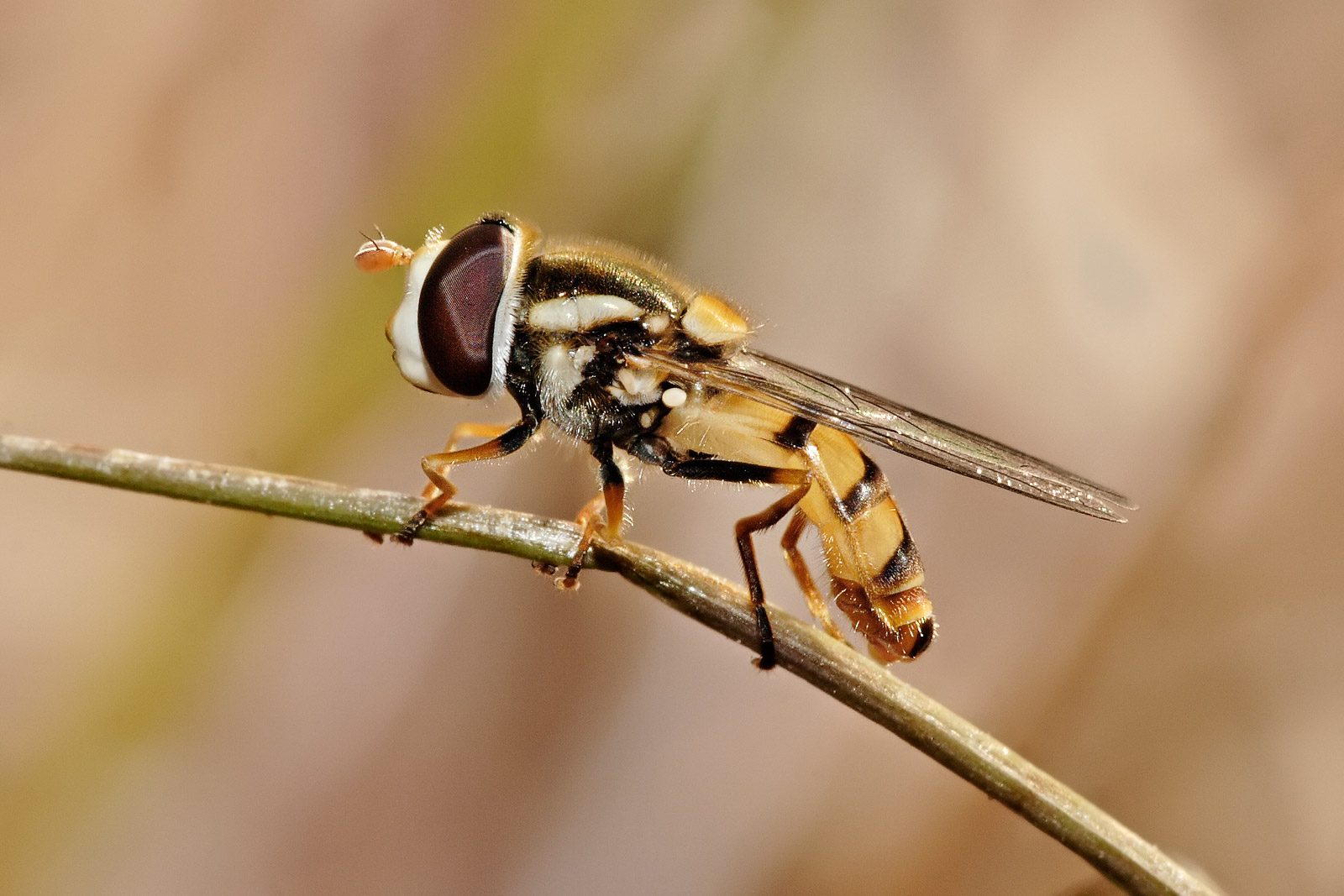
A syrphid fly, an example of a T. hirsuticaulis pollinator

During early spring, the flowers of T. hirsuticaulis open for around a day, during which time insects visit them despite offering no nutritional advantage, such as nectar. The species has no specialized dispersal mechanisms for its pollen, and most pollen is believed to be spread mostly by bees and syrphid flies. Unique to T. hirsuticaulis, it serves as a host for Jalysus spinosus, a form of stilt bug, also known as a berytid. In fact, no other member of the Commelinaceae family serves as a host for berytids. J. spinosus is believed to feed on the plants glandular hairs and bugs trapped by the plant's secretions. Adult members of the species have also been observed on the plant's fruit and pedicels with nymphs, suggesting that their eggs are possibly laid on the plant.

Though wind pollination is possible, it is unlikely due to the plant's small size, and only one member of the family has been observed exhibiting such behaviors. The seeds that form following pollination are often dispersed through gravity and the movement of water around the plant.

It is unknown as to whether the species can self-pollinate. Robert Wyatt at the University of Georgia also reports using unpublished data that the species is not self-compatible, but does not show how this work was performed. Most members of the Tradescantia genus are self-incompatible, including those most closely related to T. hirsuticaulis. However, there are Tradescantia species who exhibit self-compatibility despite their closest relatives being self-incompatible, suggesting that it is possible for T. hirsuticaulis to self-pollinate.

=== Growth ===
T. hirsuticaulis’s high drought tolerance allows it to grow in dry conditions, mainly in dry woods and rocky environments. Plants belonging to the species also often grow better in shaded environments. Throughout the summer months, the plant tends to be dormant before being evergreen during the winter. In warmer environments, the plant can grow as a perennial evergreen and pruning is often performed after the plant has bloomed. In colder climates it lives an annual life cycle.

=== Toxicity ===
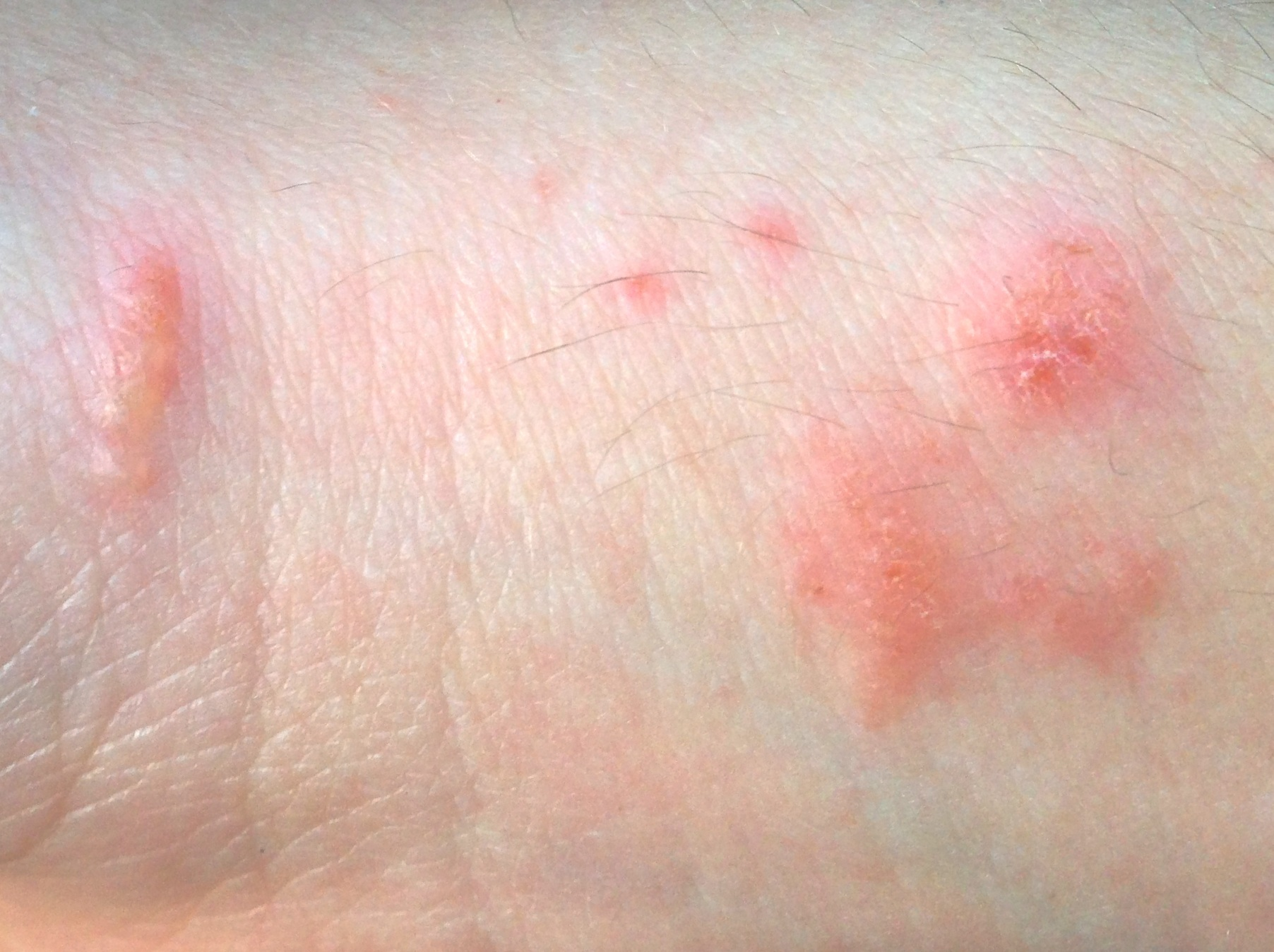
Contact dermatitis on a human caused by poison ivy.

The plant is known to cause contact dermatitis when in contact with human and pet skin. While the source of the irritation is unknown, it is known that contact with the flowers, fruit, leaves, roots, sap, seeds, and stems all cause irritation. Ingestion of these parts can also irritate the mouth and stomach.

== Genetic variation ==
T. hirsuticaulis has a 12n ploidy level. Though the species has scattered populations, it still experiences there are still high levels of variation within the species. A 1993 study found that out of 33 loci tested, 29 were polymorphic. The authors also discovered that the species had a moderate level of variation with an average of 3.24 alleles per loci across all tested populations. They calculated the species' expected heterozygosity value as being 0.206, which is higher than the mean of 0.096 for short-lived herbaceous perennials.

== Uses ==
Occasionally, the plant is used as an ornamental decoration. It can be specifically employed along walkways and rock gardens serving as a groundcover. Groundcovers assist with preventing erosion while simultaneously preventing weeds from growing. This specific usage for the plant uncommon. Other spiderworts are occasionally used by Native American tribes for medicine and food. Members of those tribes occasionally eat Tradescantia virginiana leaves in salad, while some historically believed that mixing its roots and various plant parts could heal cancer or kidney issues. Whether Native American groups used T. hirsuticaulis for such purposes in unknown.
