= Hoplinus echinatus =

Scientific classification
- Domain: Eukaryota
- Kingdom: Animalia
- Phylum: Arthropoda
- Class: Insecta
- Order: Hemiptera
- Suborder: Heteroptera
- Family: Berytidae
- Tribe: Hoplinini
- Genus: Hoplinus
- Species: H. echinatus

Binomial name
- Hoplinus echinatus (Uhler, 1893)

Synonyms
- Acanthophysa echinata Uhler, 1893; Acanthophysa idaho Harris, 1941

Species of true bug

Hoplinus echinatus is a species of stilt bug in the family Berytidae. It is found in Central America and North America.
