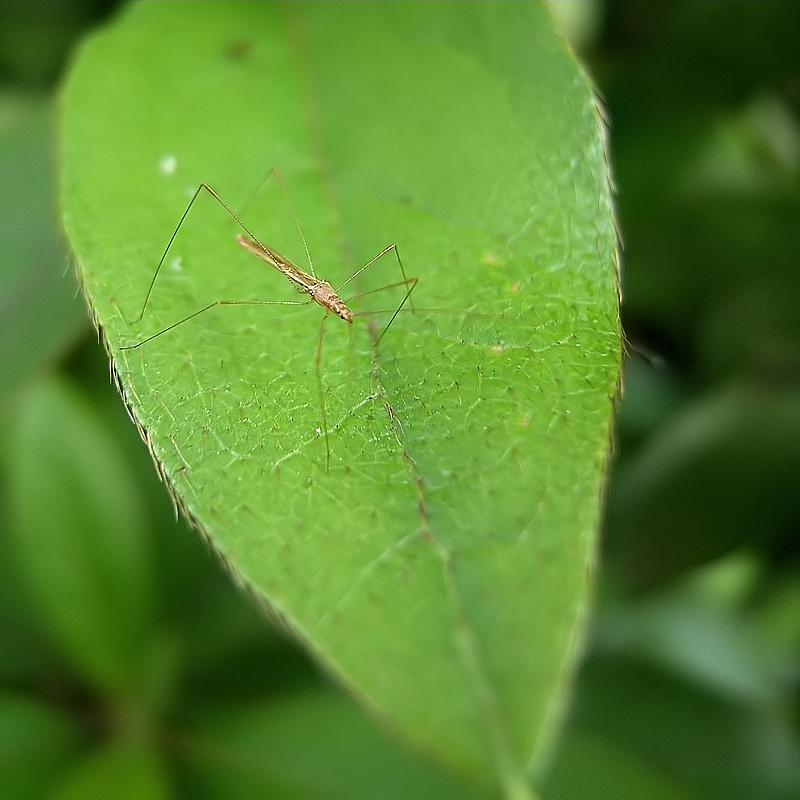
- Yemma exilis

Scientific classification
- Kingdom: Animalia
- Phylum: Arthropoda
- Clade: Pancrustacea
- Class: Insecta
- Order: Hemiptera
- Suborder: Heteroptera
- Family: Berytidae
- Subfamily: Metacanthinae
- Genus: Yemma
- Species: Y. exilis

Binomial name
- Yemma exilis Horvath, 1905

= Yemma exilis =

Species of stilt bug

Yemma exilis is a species of stilt bug in the family Berytidae. It is found in eastern Asia, especially Korea and Japan.
