= Pronotacantha annulata =

Scientific classification
- Domain: Eukaryota
- Kingdom: Animalia
- Phylum: Arthropoda
- Class: Insecta
- Order: Hemiptera
- Suborder: Heteroptera
- Family: Berytidae
- Tribe: Hoplinini
- Genus: Pronotacantha
- Species: P. annulata

Binomial name
- Pronotacantha annulata Uhler, 1893

Species of true bug

Pronotacantha annulata is a species of stilt bug in the family Berytidae. It is found in Central America and North America.
