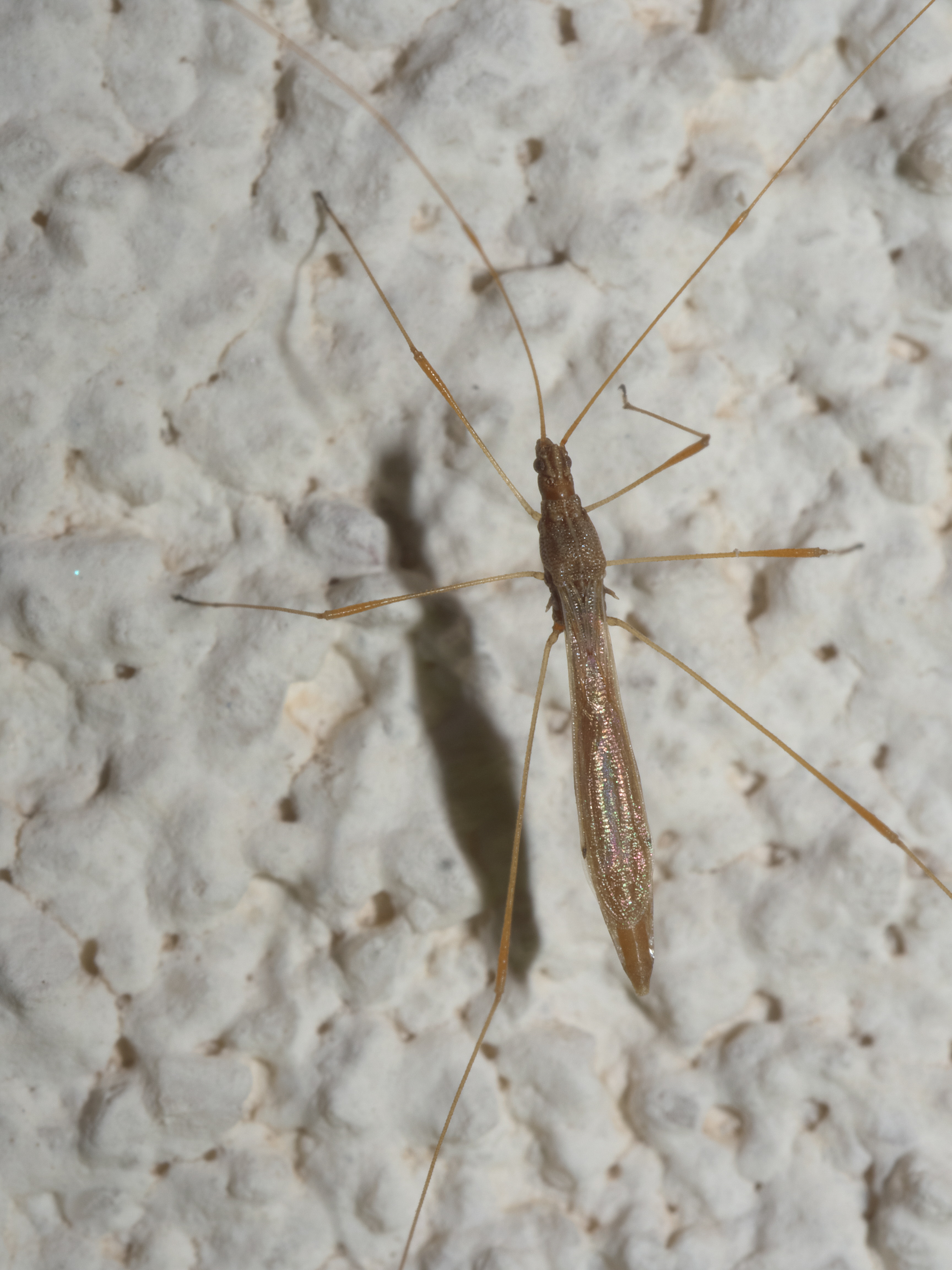

Scientific classification
- Domain: Eukaryota
- Kingdom: Animalia
- Phylum: Arthropoda
- Class: Insecta
- Order: Hemiptera
- Suborder: Heteroptera
- Family: Berytidae
- Subfamily: Metacanthinae
- Genus: Jalysus
- Species: J. wickhami

Binomial name
- Jalysus wickhami Van Duzee, 1906

= Jalysus wickhami =

Species of true bug

Jalysus wickhami, the spined stilt bug, is a species of stilt bug in the family Berytidae. It is found in Central America and North America.

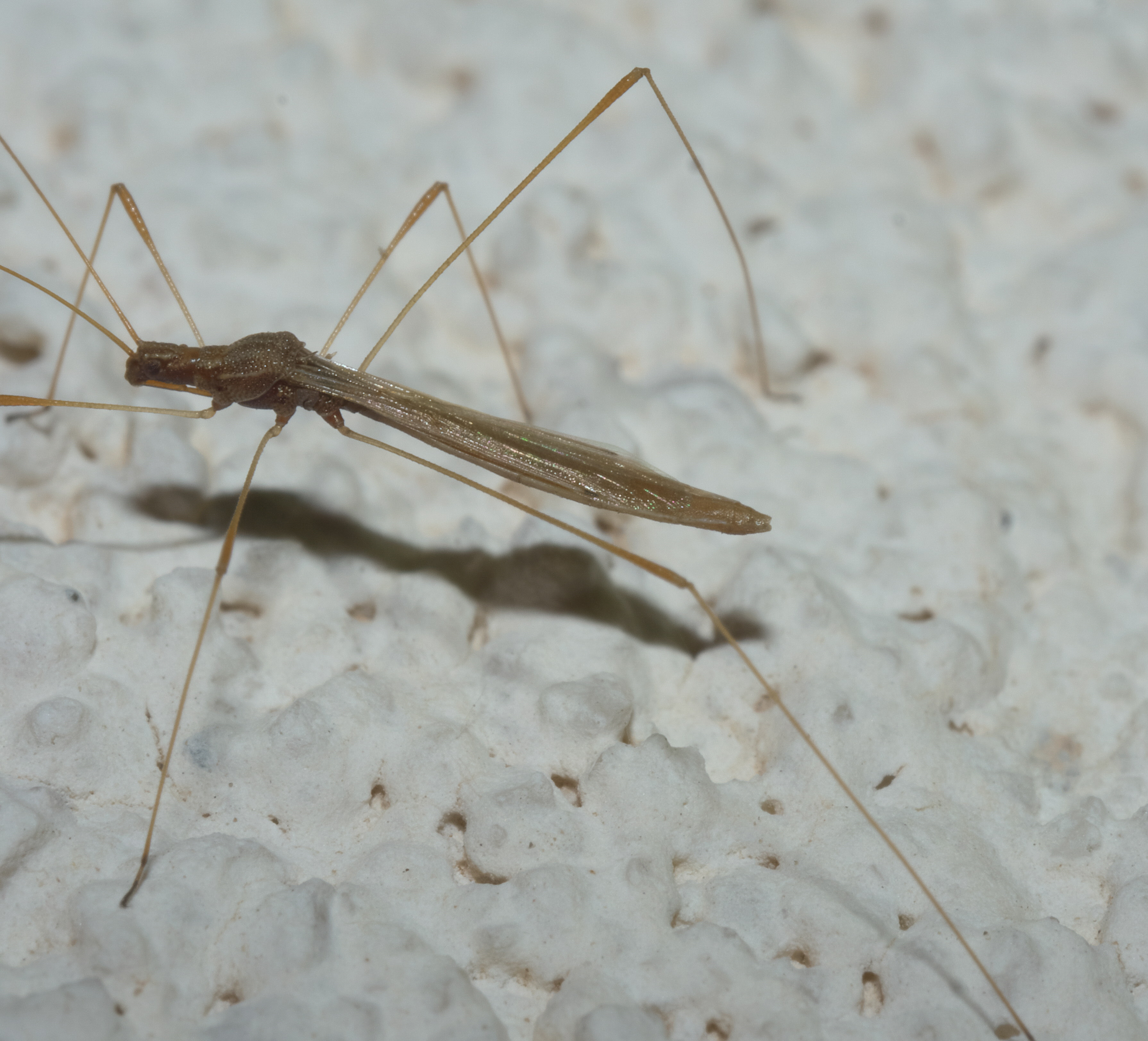
Spined stilt bug, Jalysus wickhami

It is the most common stilt bug of the eastern US, living in gardens or meadows from summer to autumn. Their diet is composed of plant juices from legumes, grass and tomato plants and their feeding can cause unripe tomatoes to drop.
