= Yemma =

Yemma may refer to:

- Yemma: mother in Arabic, Berber and Hebrew
- Yemma (bug), a genus of stilt bugs
- Yemma, a former village on the site of present-day Yavne'el, Israel
- Yem people, an ethnic group in south-western Ethiopia
- Yama, a Hindu and Buddhist deity
