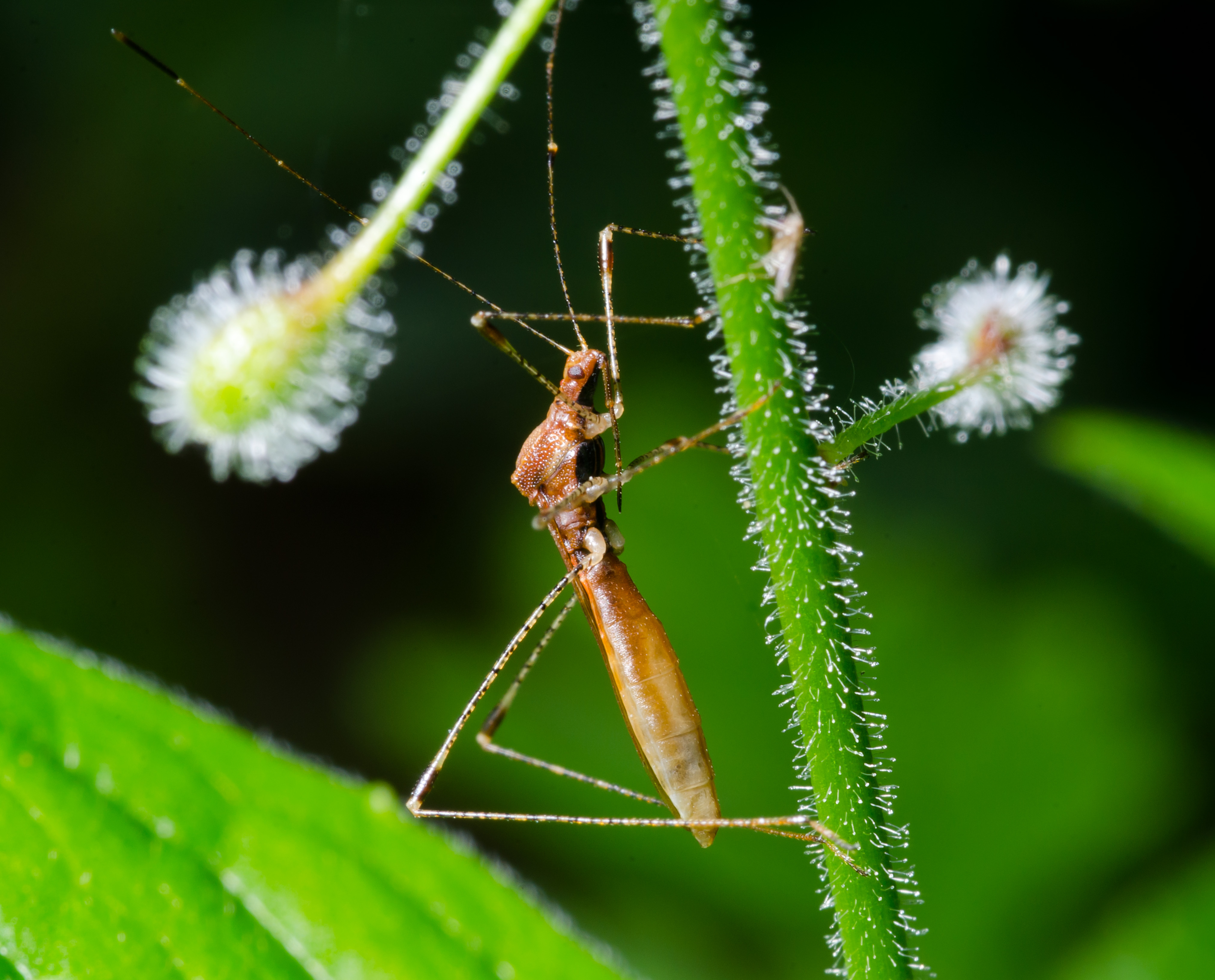

Scientific classification
- Domain: Eukaryota
- Kingdom: Animalia
- Phylum: Arthropoda
- Class: Insecta
- Order: Hemiptera
- Suborder: Heteroptera
- Family: Berytidae
- Genus: Metatropis
- Species: M. rufescens

Binomial name
- Metatropis rufescens (Herrich-Schäffer, 1835)

= Metatropis rufescens =

Species of true bug

Metatropis rufescens is a species of true bug. The species is found in Europe, with the exception of the far North and South then East to the Black Sea region and across the Palearctic to Siberia. In Central Europe it is common, but it is not found everywhere. In the British Isles it is common in the South including Wales and Ireland. It occurs in shady, mostly moist habitats in deciduous forests.

in copula video

Metatropis rufescens feeds exclusively on Circaea (Circaea lutetiana), Circaea x intermedia and in the Alps Circaea alpina. They feed predominantly on the reproductive organs of the plants. Overwintering occurs as an imago under loose bark or dry ground litter. Mating occurs in May. Flight-active bugs are found not only on the food plant, but also on other herbaceous plants and even trees. The females lay their eggs individually in June and July on the stems and leaves of Circaea. From August, sometimes also in July, the imagines of the new generation occur, and nymphs can be found until September.
