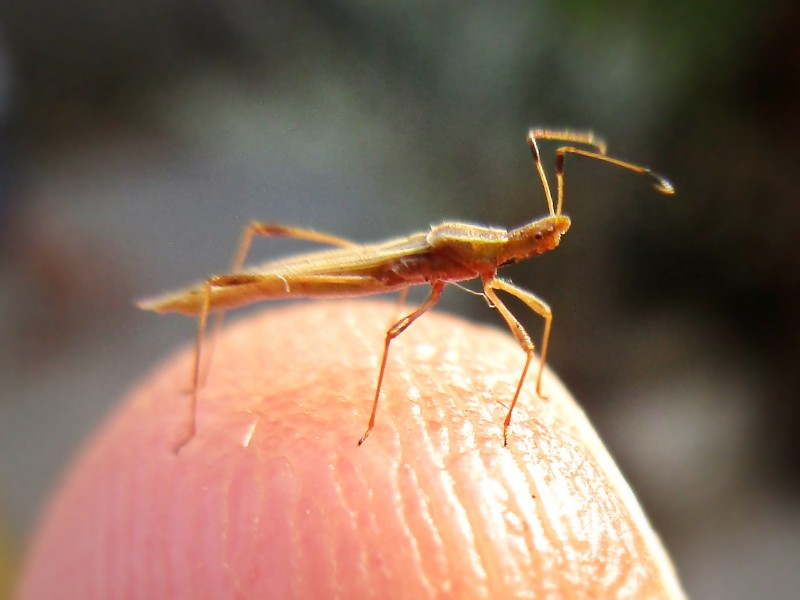

Scientific classification
- Domain: Eukaryota
- Kingdom: Animalia
- Phylum: Arthropoda
- Class: Insecta
- Order: Hemiptera
- Suborder: Heteroptera
- Family: Berytidae
- Genus: Berytinus
- Species: B. minor

Binomial name
- Berytinus minor (Herrich-schaeffer, 1835)

= Berytinus minor =

Species of true bug

Berytinus minor is a species of stilt bug in the family Berytidae. It is found in Africa, Europe and Northern Asia (excluding China), and North America.

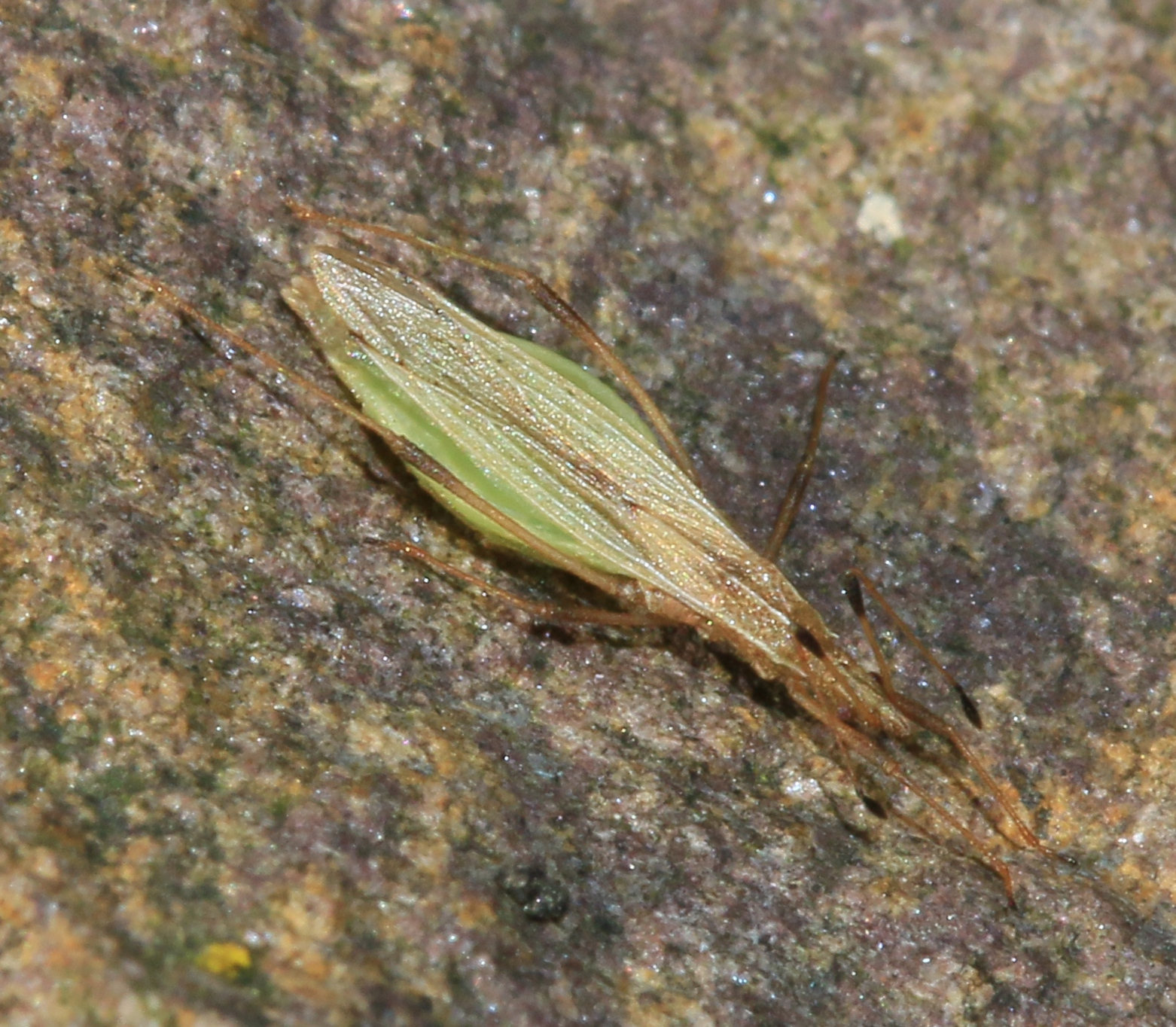

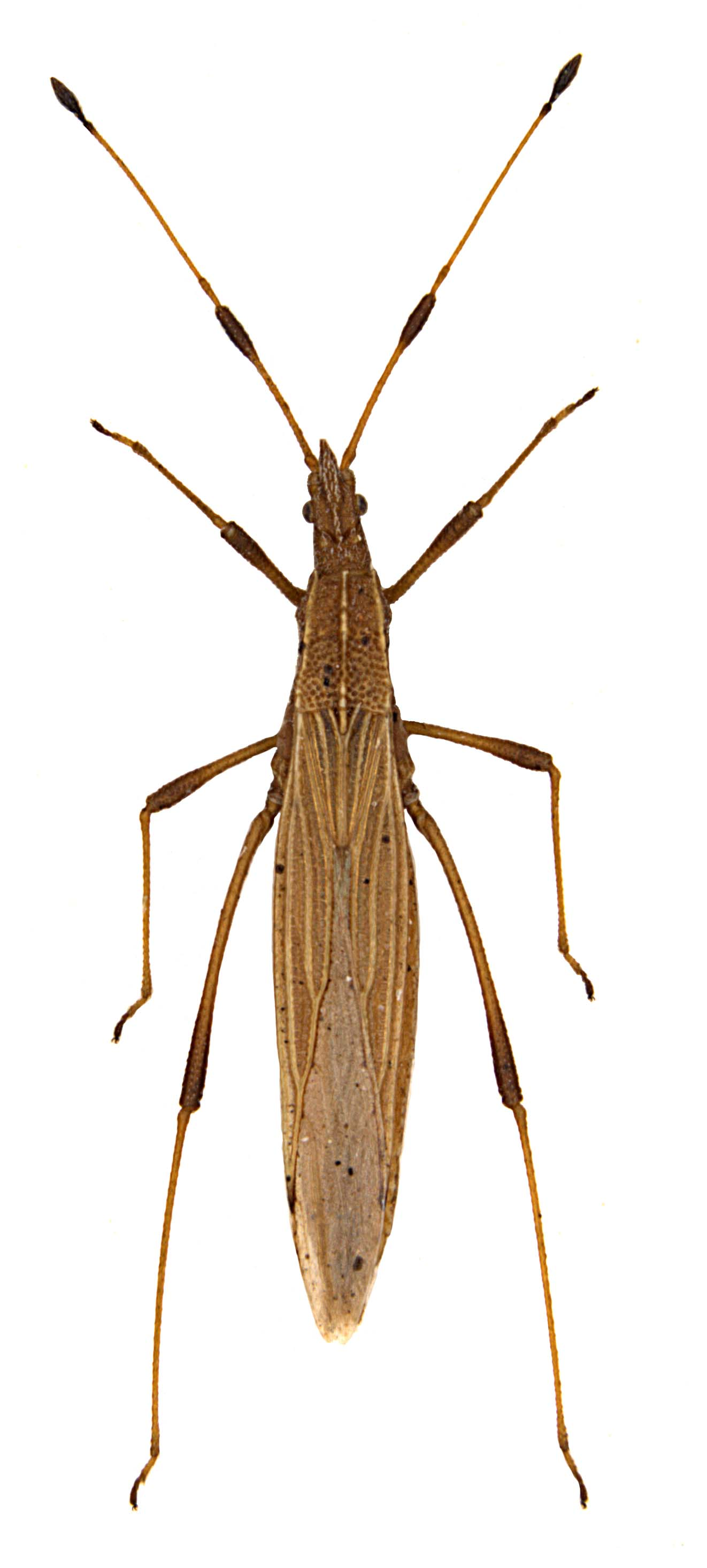

== Subspecies ==
These two subspecies belong to the species Berytinus minor:

- Berytinus minor hybridus (Horvath, 1891)
- Berytinus minor minor (Herrich-Schaeffer, 1835)
