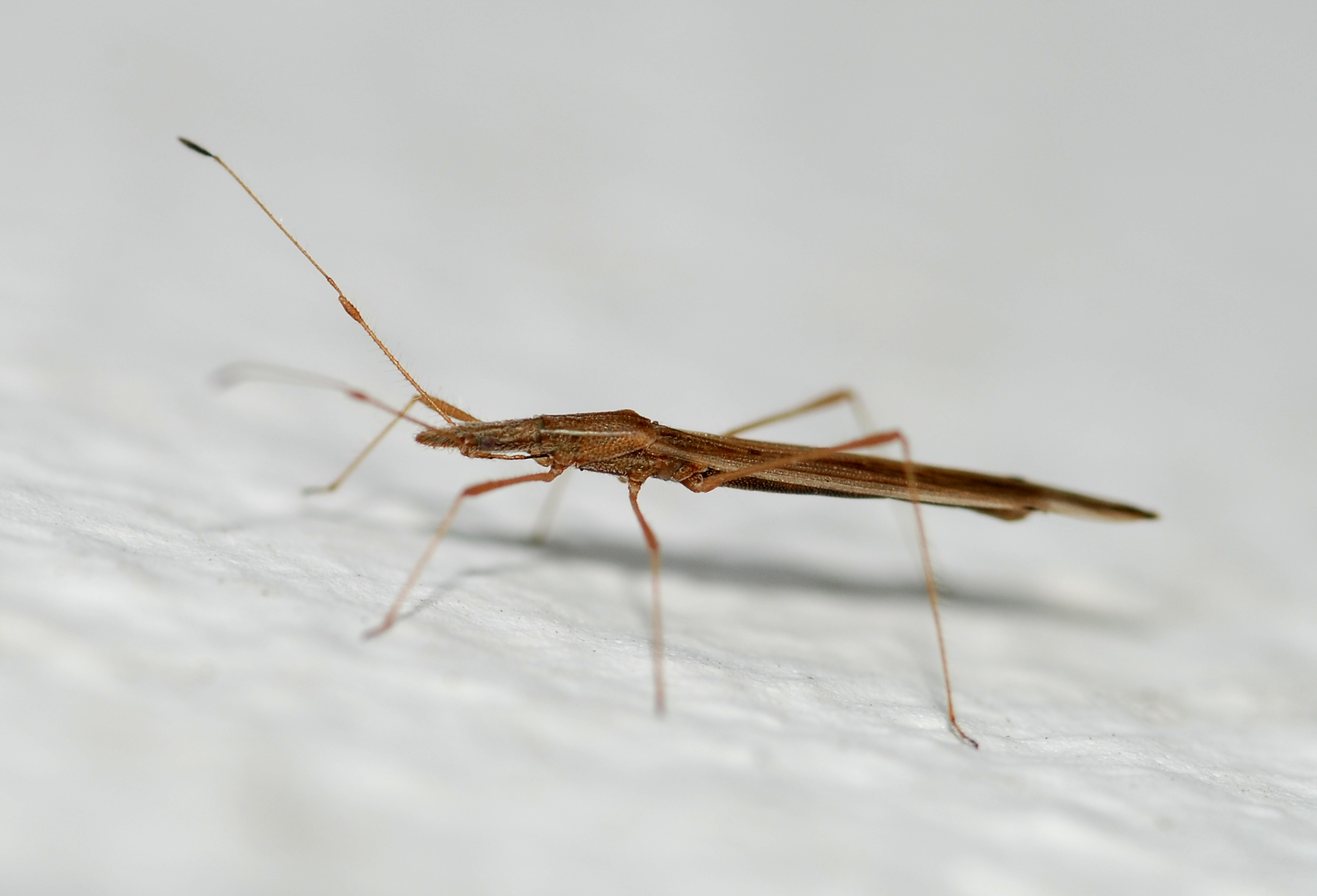
- Neides tipularius

Scientific classification
- Domain: Eukaryota
- Kingdom: Animalia
- Phylum: Arthropoda
- Class: Insecta
- Order: Hemiptera
- Suborder: Heteroptera
- Family: Berytidae
- Subfamily: Berytinae
- Genus: Neides; Fabricius, 1802

Synonyms
- Berytus Fabricius, 1803

= Neides =

Genus of true bugs

The genus Neides is a small but common Old World group of stilt bugs; the name has precedence of the junior synonym name Berytus which Fabricius coined for the same taxon in 1803. It formerly included one North American species (Neides muticus), which has been removed to its own genus, Neoneides.

== Species ==
- Neides aduncus (Fieber, 1859)
- Neides brevipennis Puton, 1895
- Neides gomeranus Heiss, 1978
- Neides tipularius (Linnaeus, 1758)
