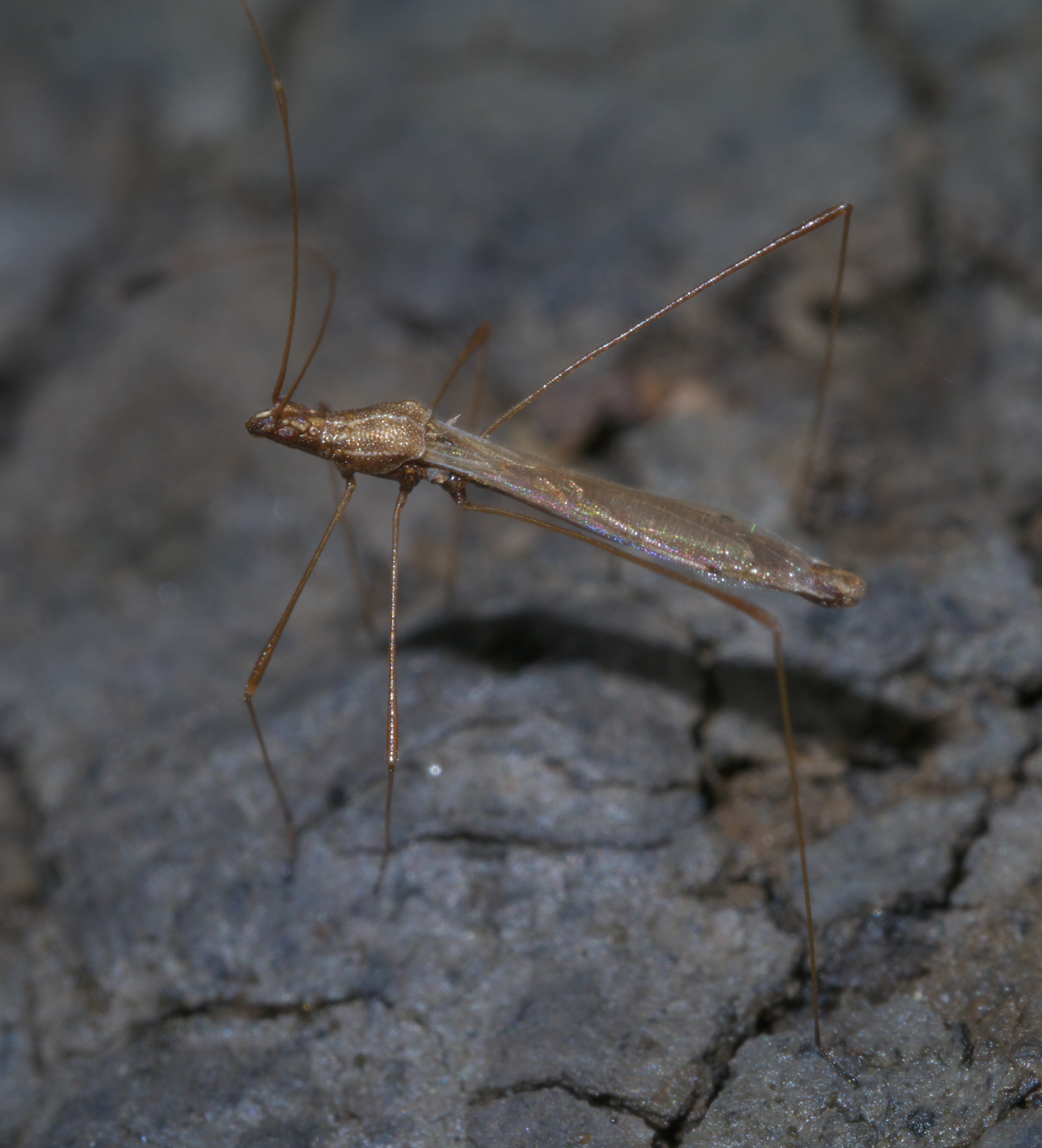

Scientific classification
- Domain: Eukaryota
- Kingdom: Animalia
- Phylum: Arthropoda
- Class: Insecta
- Order: Hemiptera
- Suborder: Heteroptera
- Family: Berytidae
- Subfamily: Metacanthinae
- Genus: Jalysus; Stal, 1862

= Jalysus =

Genus of true bugs

Jalysus is a genus of stilt bugs in the family Berytidae. There are about 12 described species in Jalysus.

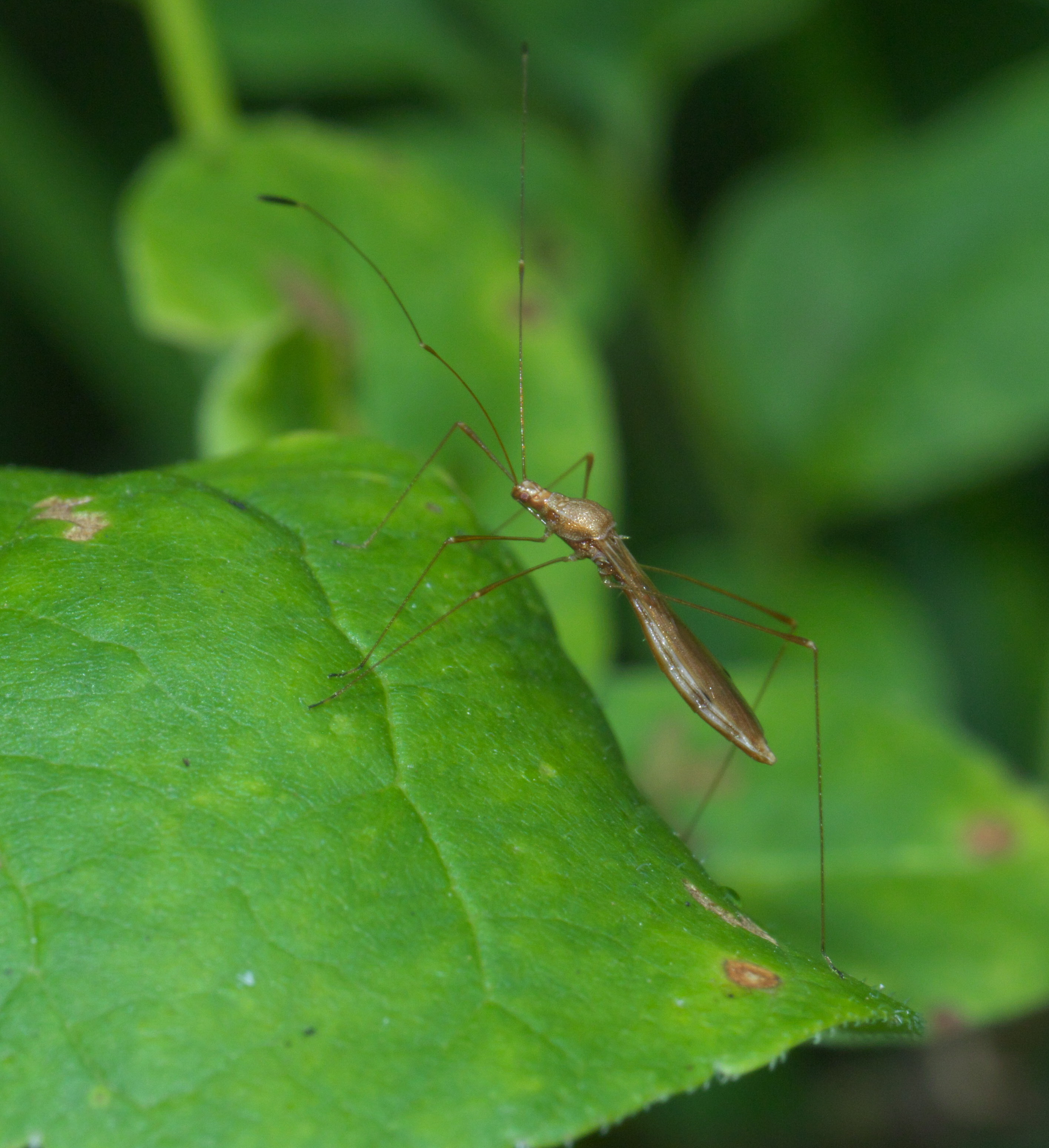

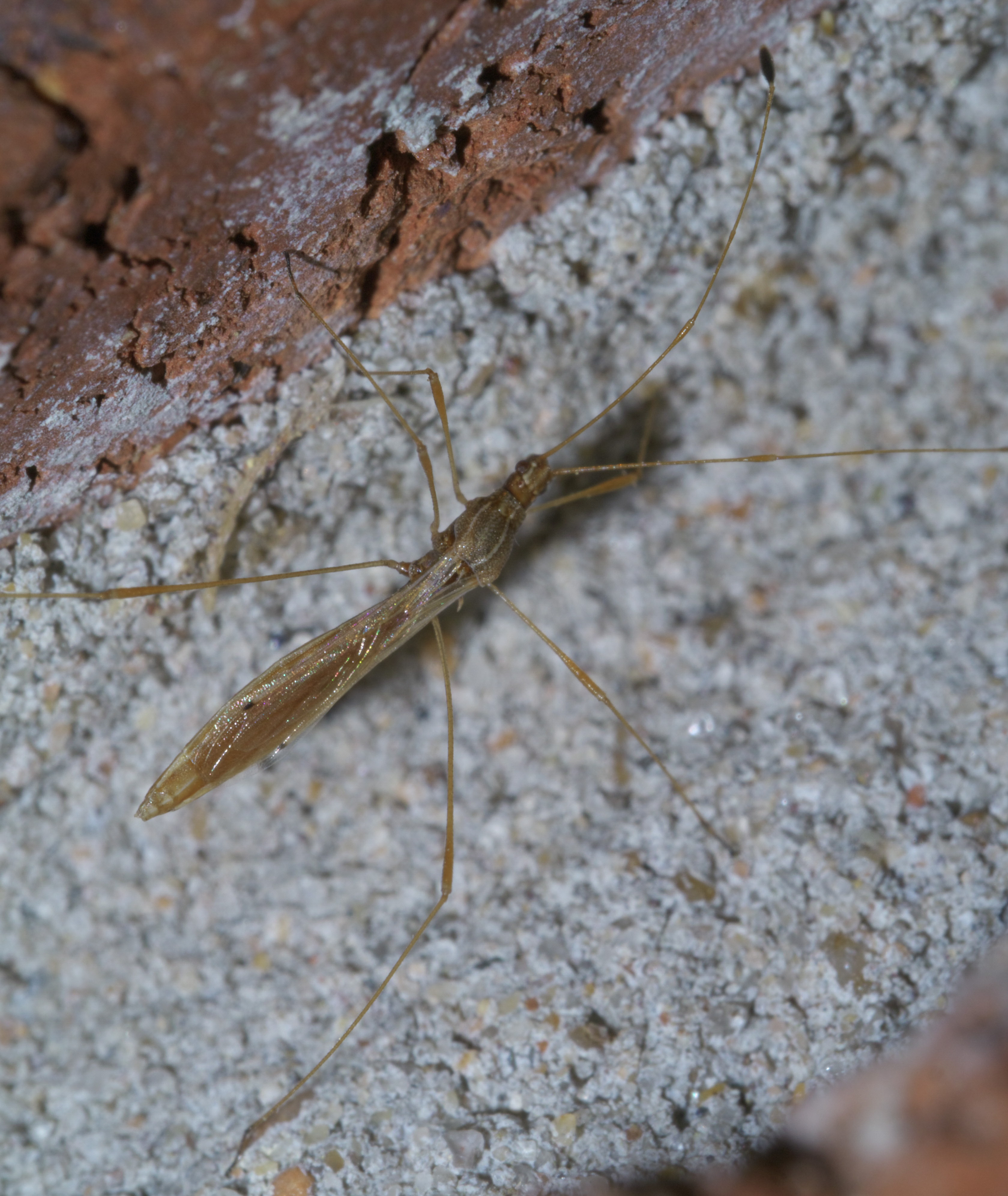

== Species ==
These 12 species belong to the genus Jalysus:

- Jalysus albidus Stusak, 1968
- Jalysus caducus (Distant, 1884)
- Jalysus clavatus Henry, 1997
- Jalysus macer (Stal, 1859)
- Jalysus mexicanus Henry, 1997
- Jalysus nigriventris Henry, 1997
- Jalysus ossesae Henry, 2007
- Jalysus reductus Barber, 1939
- Jalysus sobrinus Stal, 1862
- Jalysus spinosus (Say, 1824)
- Jalysus tuberculatus Henry, 1997
- Jalysus wickhami Van Duzee, 1906 (spined stilt bug)
