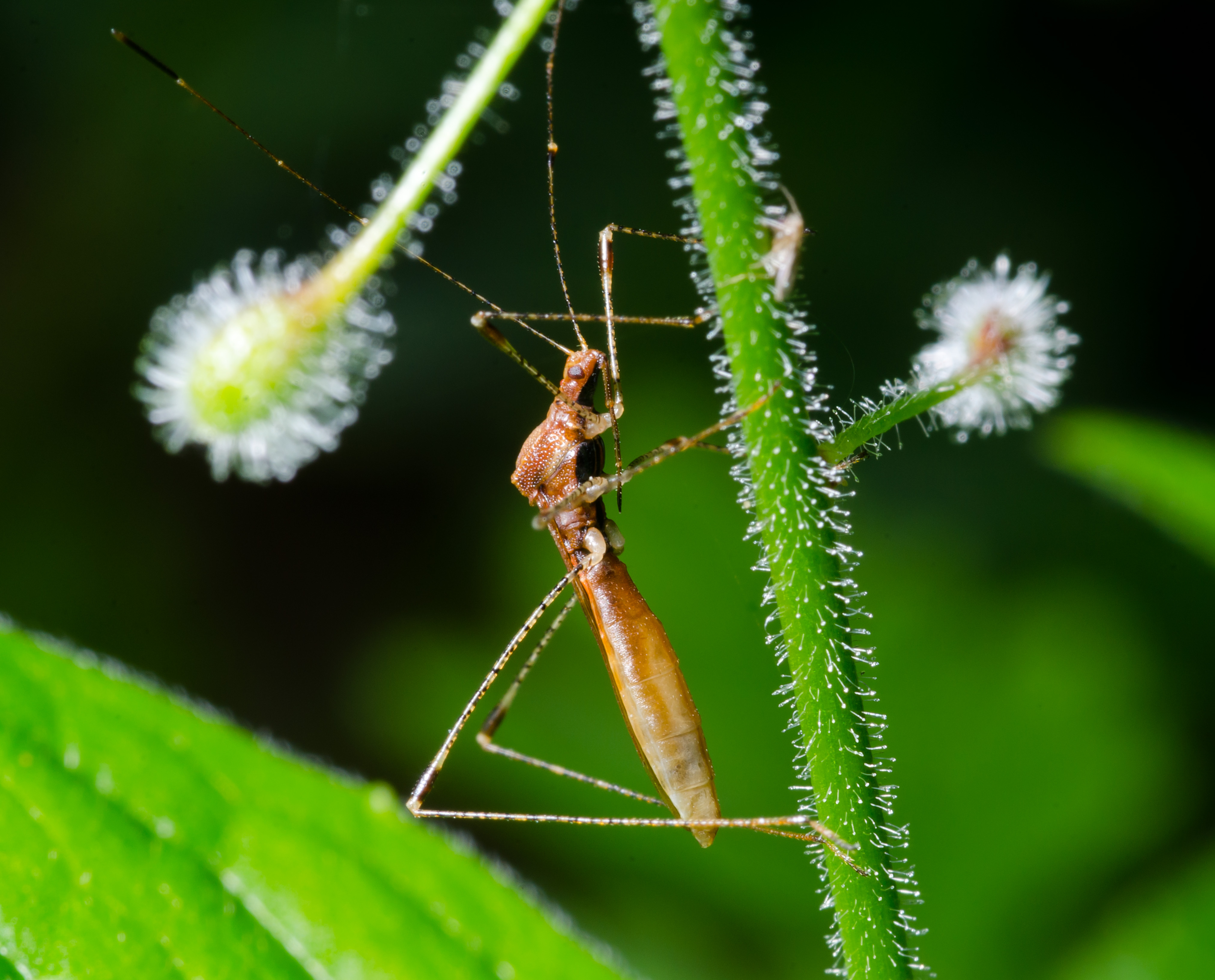
- Metatropis rufescens

Scientific classification
- Domain: Eukaryota
- Kingdom: Animalia
- Phylum: Arthropoda
- Class: Insecta
- Order: Hemiptera
- Suborder: Heteroptera
- Family: Berytidae
- Subfamily: Metacanthinae
- Tribe: Metatropini
- Genus: Metatropis; Fieber, 1859

= Metatropis =

Genus of true bugs

Metatropis is a genus of true bugs belonging to the family Berytidae.

The species of this genus are found in Europe and Japan.

Species:

- Metatropis aurita Breddin, 1907
- Metatropis brevirostris Hsiao, 1974
- Metatropis denticollis Lindberg, 1934
- Metatropis gibbicollis Hsiao, 1974
- Metatropis humilis Stusak, 1972
- Metatropis longirostris Hsiao, 1974
- Metatropis nigripes Stusak, 1967
- Metatropis rufescens (Herrich-Schaeffer, 1835)
- Metatropis spinicollis Hsiao, 1974
- Metatropis tesongsanica Josifov, 1975
