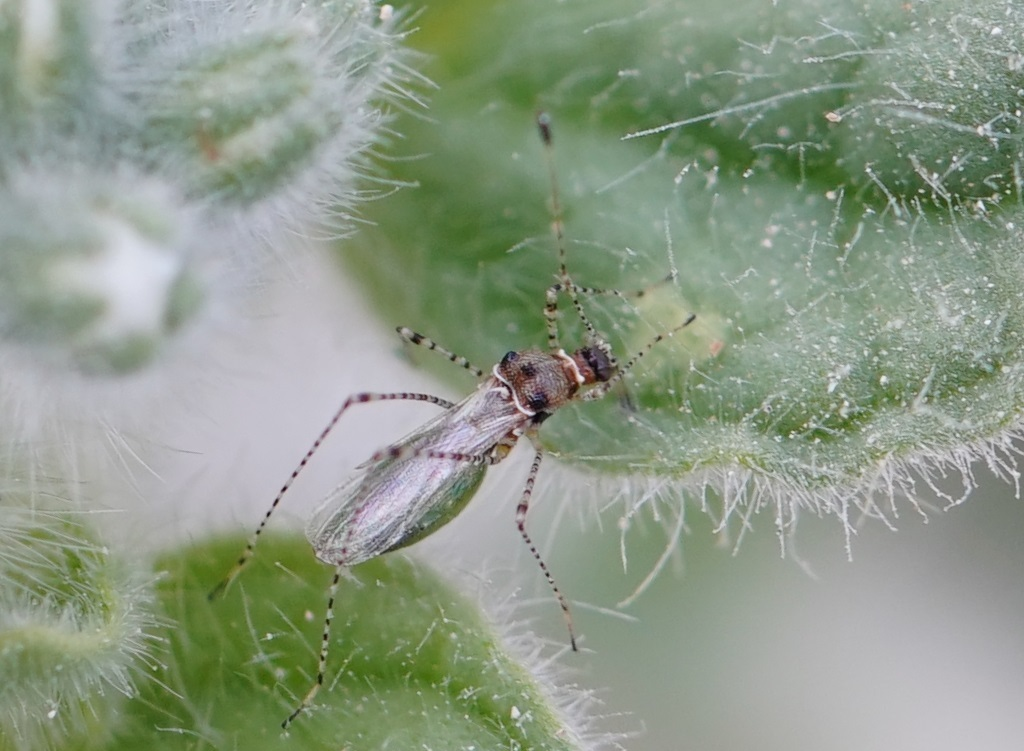
- Gampsocoris punctipes

Scientific classification
- Domain: Eukaryota
- Kingdom: Animalia
- Phylum: Arthropoda
- Class: Insecta
- Order: Hemiptera
- Suborder: Heteroptera
- Family: Berytidae
- Tribe: Gampsocorini
- Genus: Gampsocoris; Fuss, 1852

Synonyms
- Armanus Mulsant & Rey, 1870; Auchenoplus Bergroth, 1913; Lindbergius Josifov, 1965

= Gampsocoris =

Genus of true bugs

Gampsocoris is the type genus of the subfamily Gampsocorinae and tribe Gampsocorini. These stilt bugs species are mostly recorded from Europe and Africa.

== Species ==
According to BioLib the following are included:

1. Gampsocoris africanus (Stusak, 1966)
2. Gampsocoris bihamatus (Distant, 1909)
3. Gampsocoris culicinus Seidenstücker, 1948
4. Gampsocoris decorus (Uhler, 1893)
5. Gampsocoris enslini Seidenstücker, 1953
6. Gampsocoris gatai Günther, 1997
7. Gampsocoris gibberosus (Horváth, 1922)
8. Gampsocoris gomeranus Wagner, 1965
9. Gampsocoris lilianae Josifov, 1958
10. Gampsocoris linnavuorii Henry, 2016
11. Gampsocoris minutus Josifov, 1965
12. Gampsocoris pacificus (China, 1930)
13. Gampsocoris panorminus Seidenstücker, 1965
14. Gampsocoris punctipes (Germar, 1822)
15. Gampsocoris tuberculatus (Štusák, 1966)
