= Bezu (bug) =

Scientific classification
- Domain: Eukaryota
- Kingdom: Animalia
- Phylum: Arthropoda
- Class: Insecta
- Order: Hemiptera
- Suborder: Heteroptera
- Family: Berytidae
- Subfamily: Berytinae
- Genus: Bezu

Genus of true bugs

Bezu is a genus of stilt bugs in the family Berytidae. There are at least two described species in Bezu.

== Species ==
These two species belong to the genus Bezu:

- Bezu maiponga (Gross, G.F., 1950)^{c g}
- Bezu wakefieldi (White, F.B., 1878)^{c g}

Data sources: i = ITIS, c = Catalogue of Life, g = GBIF, b = Bugguide.net
