= Hoplinus =

Scientific classification
- Domain: Eukaryota
- Kingdom: Animalia
- Phylum: Arthropoda
- Class: Insecta
- Order: Hemiptera
- Suborder: Heteroptera
- Family: Berytidae
- Subfamily: Gampsocorinae
- Tribe: Hoplinini
- Genus: Hoplinus; Stal, 1874

Synonyms
- Acanthophysa Uhler, 1893; Saurocoris McAtee, 1919

Genus of true bugs

Hoplinus is a genus of stilt bugs in the family Berytidae. There are about six described species in Hoplinus.

== Species ==
These six species belong to the genus Hoplinus:

- Hoplinus echinatus (Uhler, 1893)
- Hoplinus paulai Henry, 2002
- Hoplinus scutellaris Henry, 1997
- Hoplinus spinosissimus (Signoret, 1863)
- Hoplinus strigosus Henry, 1997
- Hoplinus wygodzinskyi (Stusak, 1968)
