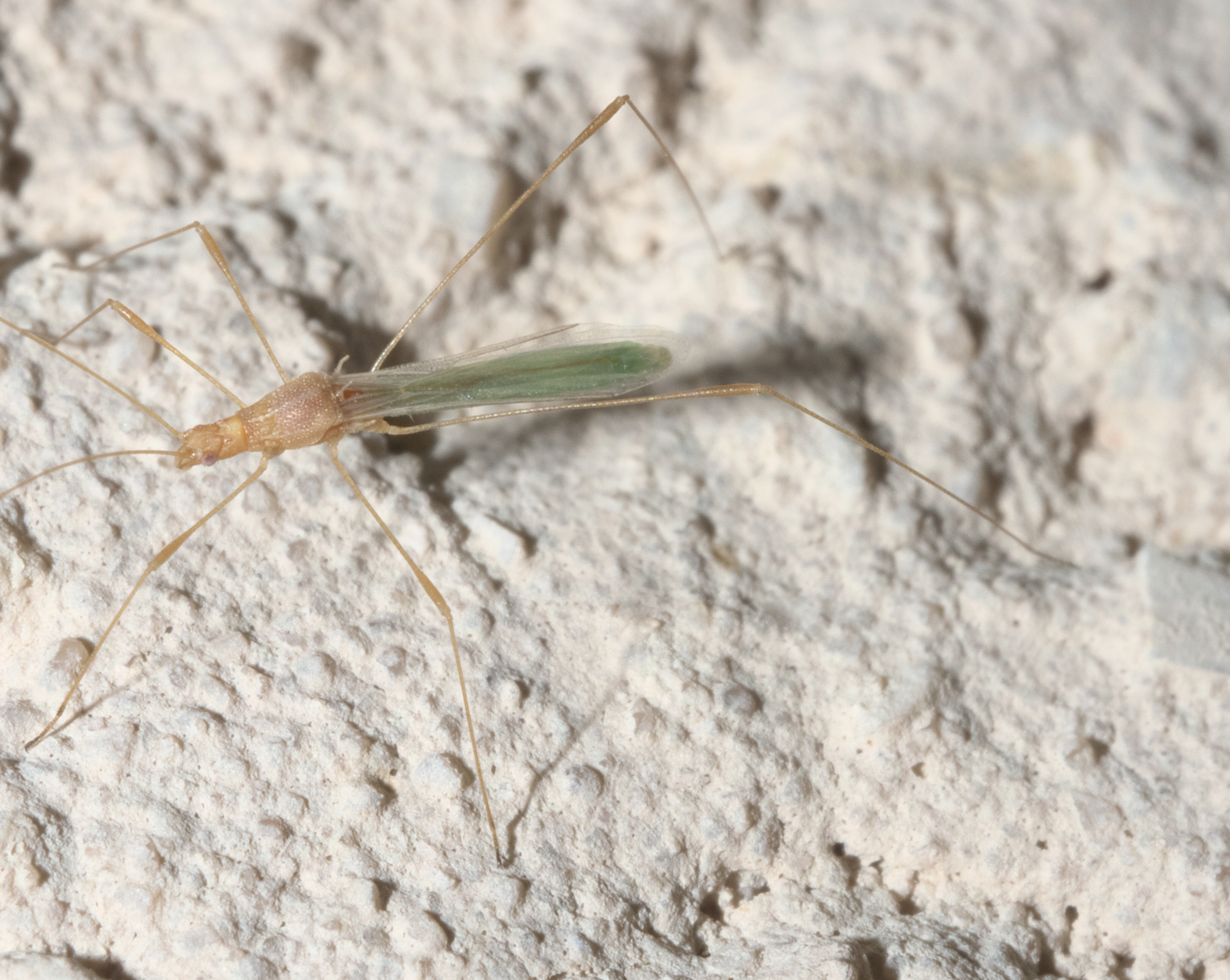

Scientific classification
- Domain: Eukaryota
- Kingdom: Animalia
- Phylum: Arthropoda
- Class: Insecta
- Order: Hemiptera
- Suborder: Heteroptera
- Family: Berytidae
- Subfamily: Metacanthinae
- Genus: Metacanthus; Costa, 1847

Synonyms
- Aknisus McAtee, 1919

= Metacanthus =

Genus of true bugs

Metacanthus is a genus of stilt bugs in the family Berytidae. There are more than 20 described species in Metacanthus.

== Species ==
These 26 species belong to the genus Metacanthus:

- Metacanthus acintus Qi & Nonnaizab, 1992
- Metacanthus annulosus (Fieber, 1859)
- Metacanthus antaoensis Lindberg, 1958
- Metacanthus braggodochio (Fernando, 1960)
- Metacanthus calvus (McAtee, 1919)
- Metacanthus concolor White, 1878
- Metacanthus delhiensis (Menon & Ghai, 1959)
- Metacanthus elegans Costa, 1847
- Metacanthus horvathi Stusak, 1964
- Metacanthus jagoensis Lindberg, 1958
- Metacanthus lineatus (Jakovlev, 1875)
- Metacanthus maghrebinus Pericart, 1977
- Metacanthus meridionalis (Costa, 1843)
- Metacanthus microphtalmus Stusak, 1965
- Metacanthus mollis Stusak, 1964
- Metacanthus multispinus (Ashmead, 1887)
- Metacanthus nigricapillus Stusak, 1964
- Metacanthus nitidus Stusak, 1964
- Metacanthus pectoralis Dallas, 1852
- Metacanthus pertenerum Breddin, 1907
- Metacanthus prima (Distant, 1918)
- Metacanthus pulchellus Dallas, 1852
- Metacanthus pusillus (Horvath, 1812)
- Metacanthus tenellus Stal, 1859
- Metacanthus tenerrimus Bergroth, 1912
- Metacanthus transvaalensis Stusak, 1963
