= Jalysus spinosus =

Scientific classification
- Domain: Eukaryota
- Kingdom: Animalia
- Phylum: Arthropoda
- Class: Insecta
- Order: Hemiptera
- Suborder: Heteroptera
- Family: Berytidae
- Genus: Jalysus
- Species: J. spinosus

Binomial name
- Jalysus spinosus (Say, 1824)

Species of true bug

Jalysus spinosus is a species of stilt bug in the family Berytidae. It is found in Central America and North America.
