= Paleologus (bug) =

Scientific classification
- Domain: Eukaryota
- Kingdom: Animalia
- Phylum: Arthropoda
- Class: Insecta
- Order: Hemiptera
- Suborder: Heteroptera
- Family: Berytidae
- Subfamily: Berytinae
- Genus: Paleologus

Genus of true bugs

Paleologus is a genus of stilt bugs in the family Berytidae. There are at least two described species in Paleologus.

== Species ==
These two species belong to the genus Paleologus:

- Paleologus achitophel Fernando, 1960^{c g}
- Paleologus feanus Distant, W.L., 1902^{c g}

Data sources: i = ITIS, c = Catalogue of Life, g = GBIF, b = Bugguide.net
