= Pronotacantha =

Scientific classification
- Domain: Eukaryota
- Kingdom: Animalia
- Phylum: Arthropoda
- Class: Insecta
- Order: Hemiptera
- Suborder: Heteroptera
- Family: Berytidae
- Subfamily: Gampsocorinae
- Tribe: Hoplinini
- Genus: Pronotacantha; Uhler, 1893

Genus of true bugs

Pronotacantha is a genus of stilt bugs in the family Berytidae. There are about seven described species in Pronotacantha.

== Species ==
These seven species belong to the genus Pronotacantha:

- Pronotacantha annulata Uhler, 1893
- Pronotacantha armata Stusak, 1973
- Pronotacantha concolor Henry, 1997
- Pronotacantha depressa Henry, 1997
- Pronotacantha mexicana Henry, 1997
- Pronotacantha quadrispina Henry, 1997
- Pronotacantha stusaki Henry, 1997
