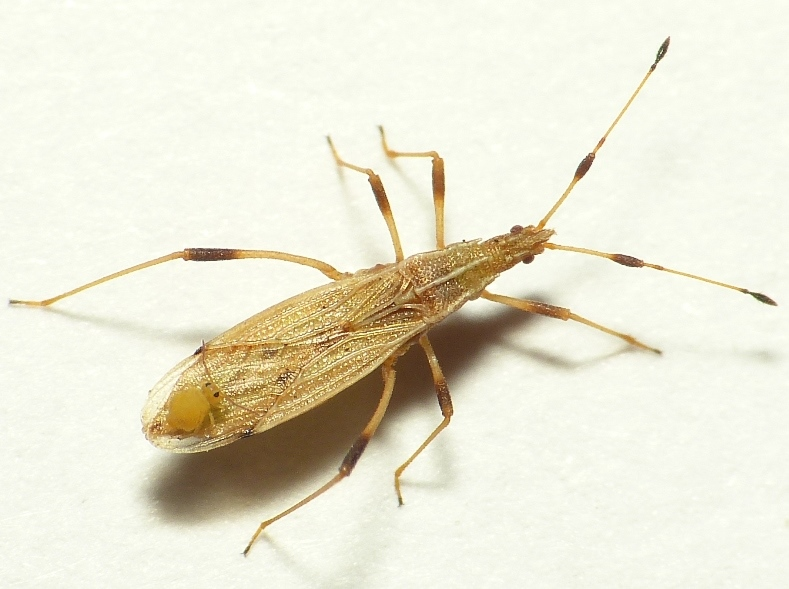
- Berytinus crassipes

Scientific classification
- Domain: Eukaryota
- Kingdom: Animalia
- Phylum: Arthropoda
- Class: Insecta
- Order: Hemiptera
- Suborder: Heteroptera
- Family: Berytidae
- Subfamily: Berytinae
- Genus: Berytinus; Kirkaldy, 1900

= Berytinus =

Genus of true bugs

Berytinus is a genus of stilt bugs in the family Berytidae. There are about 12 described species in Berytinus.

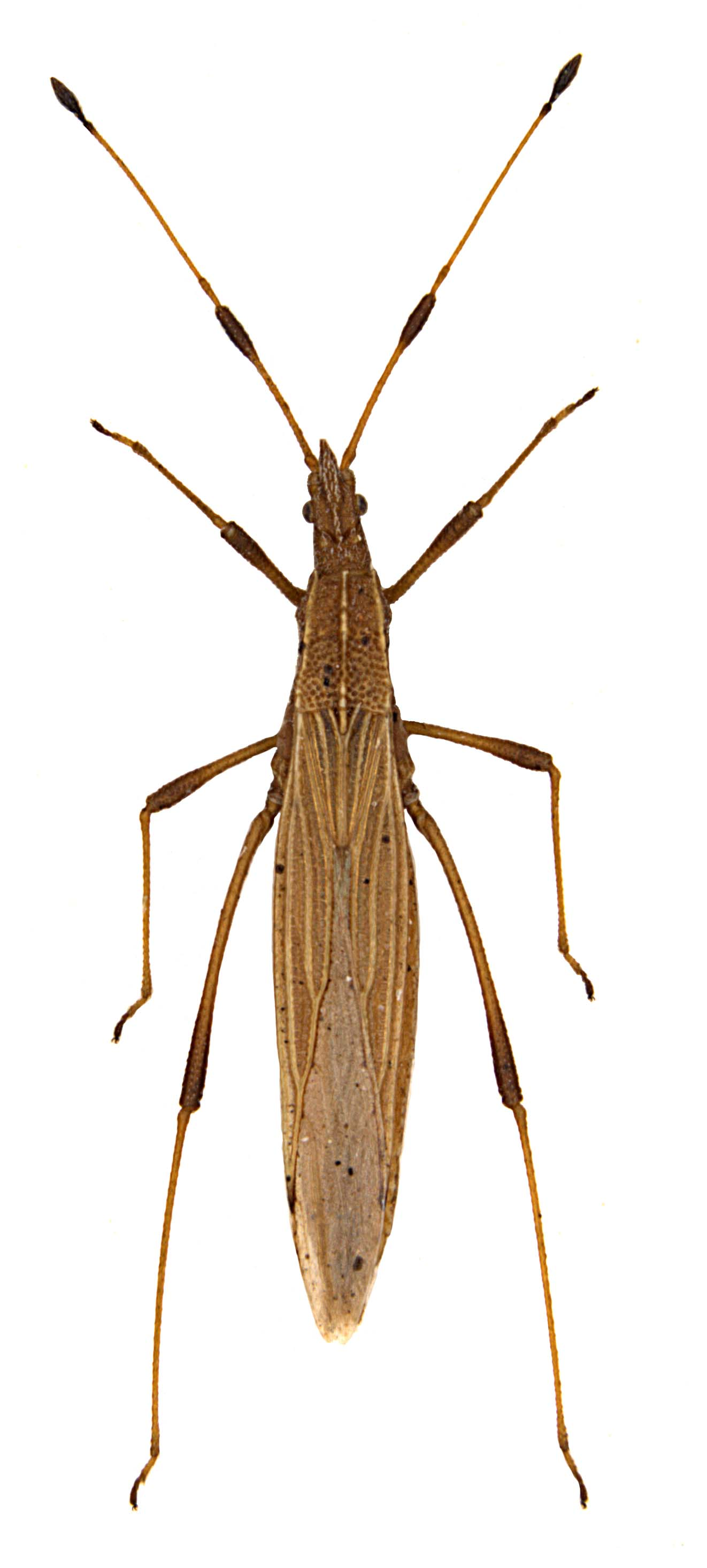
Berytinus minor

== Species ==
These 12 species belong to the genus Berytinus:

- Berytinus clavipes Fabricius, 1775
- Berytinus consimilis (Horvath, 1885)
- Berytinus crassipes (Herrich-Schaeffer, 1835)
- Berytinus distinguendus (Ferrari, 1874)
- Berytinus geniculatus (Horvath, 1885)
- Berytinus hirticornis (Brulle, 1836)
- Berytinus minor (Herrich-Schaeffer, 1835)
- Berytinus montivagus (Meyer, 1841)
- Berytinus setipennis (Saunders, 1876)
- Berytinus signoreti (Fieber, 1859)
- Berytinus strangulatus (Rey, 1888)
- Berytinus striola (Ferrari, 1874)
