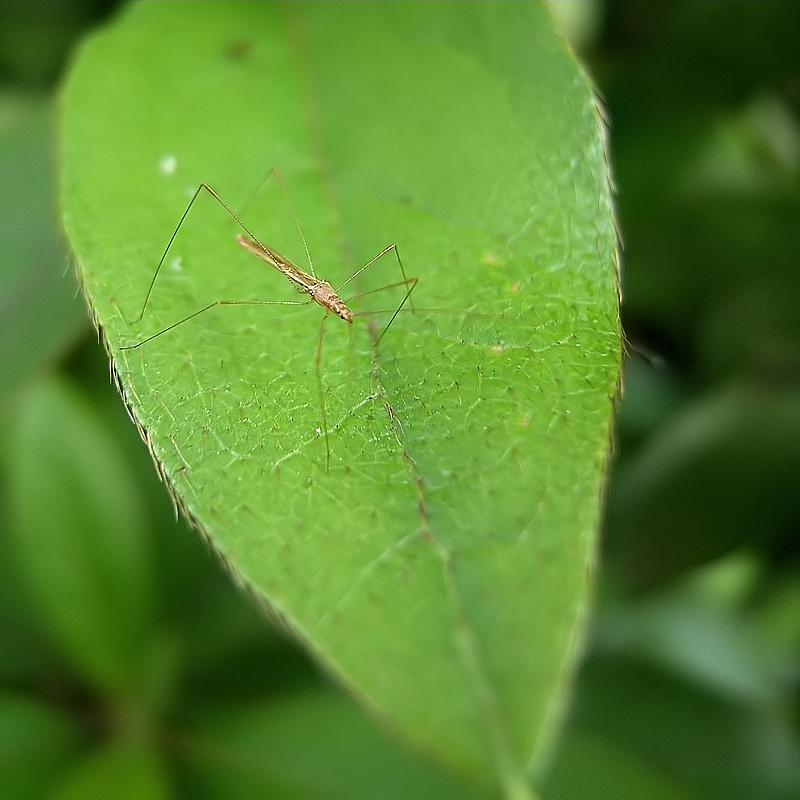
- Yemma exilis

Scientific classification
- Kingdom: Animalia
- Phylum: Arthropoda
- Class: Insecta
- Order: Hemiptera
- Suborder: Heteroptera
- Family: Berytidae
- Subfamily: Metacanthinae
- Genus: Yemma

= Yemma (bug) =

Genus of true bugs

Yemma is a genus of stilt bugs in the family Berytidae. There are about five described species in Yemma.

== Species ==
These five species belong to the genus Yemma:

- Yemma exilis Horvath, G., 1905^{c g}
- Yemma gracilis Linnavuori, R., 1974^{c g}
- Yemma javanica Blote, H.C., 1945^{c g}
- Yemma pericarti Stusak, 1984^{c g}
- Yemma signatus (Hsiao, T.Y., 1974)^{c g}

Data sources: i = ITIS, c = Catalogue of Life, g = GBIF, b = Bugguide.net
