= Neoneides =

Scientific classification
- Domain: Eukaryota
- Kingdom: Animalia
- Phylum: Arthropoda
- Class: Insecta
- Order: Hemiptera
- Suborder: Heteroptera
- Family: Berytidae
- Subfamily: Berytinae
- Genus: Neoneides; Stusak, 1989
- Species: N. muticus

Binomial name
- Neoneides muticus (Say, 1832)

Genus of true bugs

Neoneides is a genus of stilt bugs in the family Berytidae. There is one described species in Neoneides, N. muticus.
