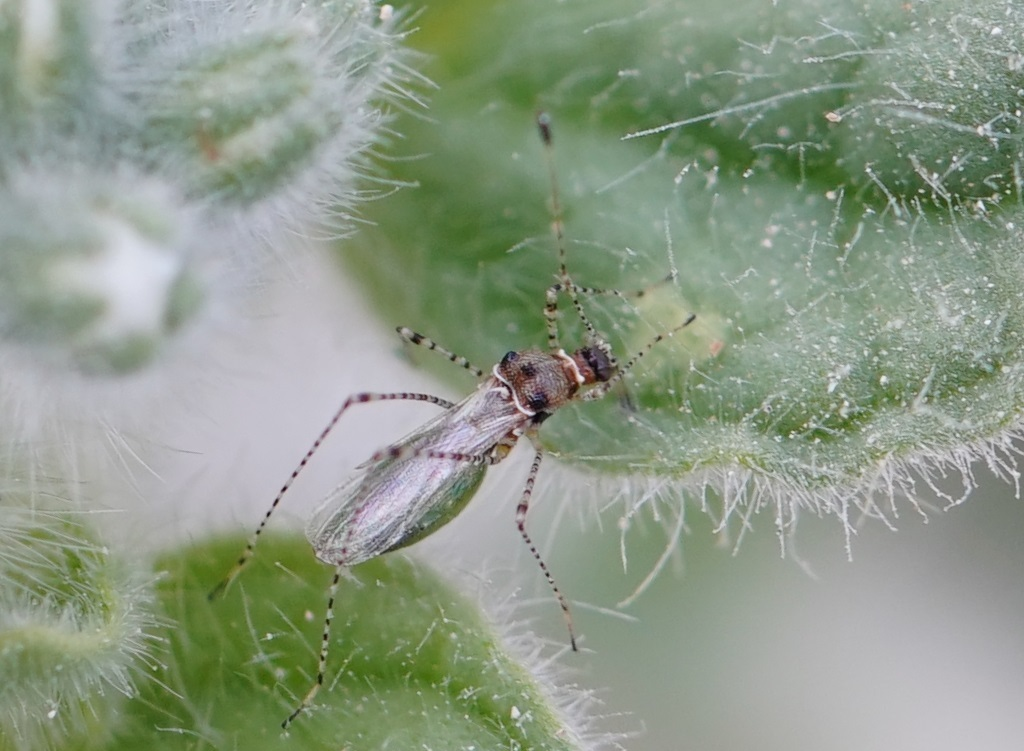
- Gampsocoris punctipes

Scientific classification
- Domain: Eukaryota
- Kingdom: Animalia
- Phylum: Arthropoda
- Class: Insecta
- Order: Hemiptera
- Suborder: Heteroptera
- Family: Berytidae
- Subfamily: Gampsocorinae; Southwood & Leston, 1959

= Gampsocorinae =

Subfamily of true bugs

Gampsocorinae is a subfamily of stilt bugs in the family Berytidae. There are about 60 described species in Gampsocorinae.

== Tribes and genera ==
BioLib includes two tribes:

=== Gampsocorini ===
Auth.: Southwood & Leston, 1959

1. Australacanthus Henry, 1997^{c g}
2. Gampsoacantha Josifov & Stusak, 1987^{c g}
3. Gampsocoris Fuss, 1852^{i c g}
4. Micrometacanthus Lindberg, 1958^{c g}

=== Hoplinini ===
Auth.:Henry, 1997

1. Bajacanthus Henry & Wall, 2019
2. Cuscohoplininus Dellapé & Carpintero, 2007^{c g}
3. Diabolonotus Henry, 1996^{c g}
4. Hoplinus Stal, 1874^{i c g b}
5. Metajalysus Stusak, 1977^{c g}
6. Oedalocanthus Henry, 1996^{i c g}
7. Parajalysus Distant, 1883^{i c g}
8. Phaconotus Harris, 1943^{c g}
9. Pronotacantha Uhler, 1893^{i c g b}
10. Xenoloma Harris, 1943^{c g}

Data sources: i = ITIS, c = Catalogue of Life, g = GBIF, b = Bugguide.net
