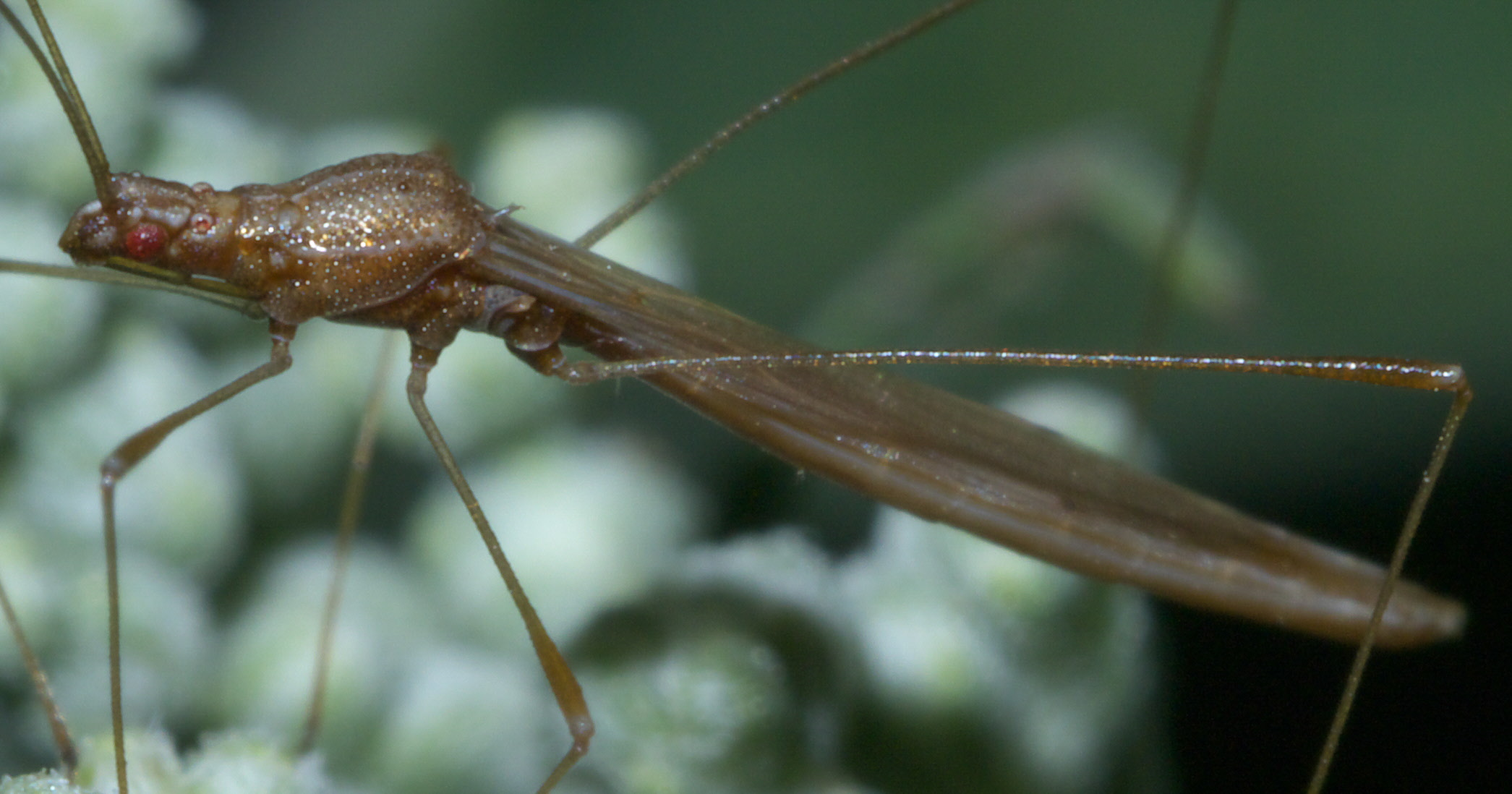

Scientific classification
- Domain: Eukaryota
- Kingdom: Animalia
- Phylum: Arthropoda
- Class: Insecta
- Order: Hemiptera
- Suborder: Heteroptera
- Family: Berytidae
- Subfamily: Metacanthinae; Douglas & Scott, 1865

Tribes
- Metacanthini; Metatropini

= Metacanthinae =

Subfamily of true bugs

Metacanthinae is a subfamily of stilt bugs in the family Berytidae. There are about 12 genera and 80 described species in Metacanthinae.

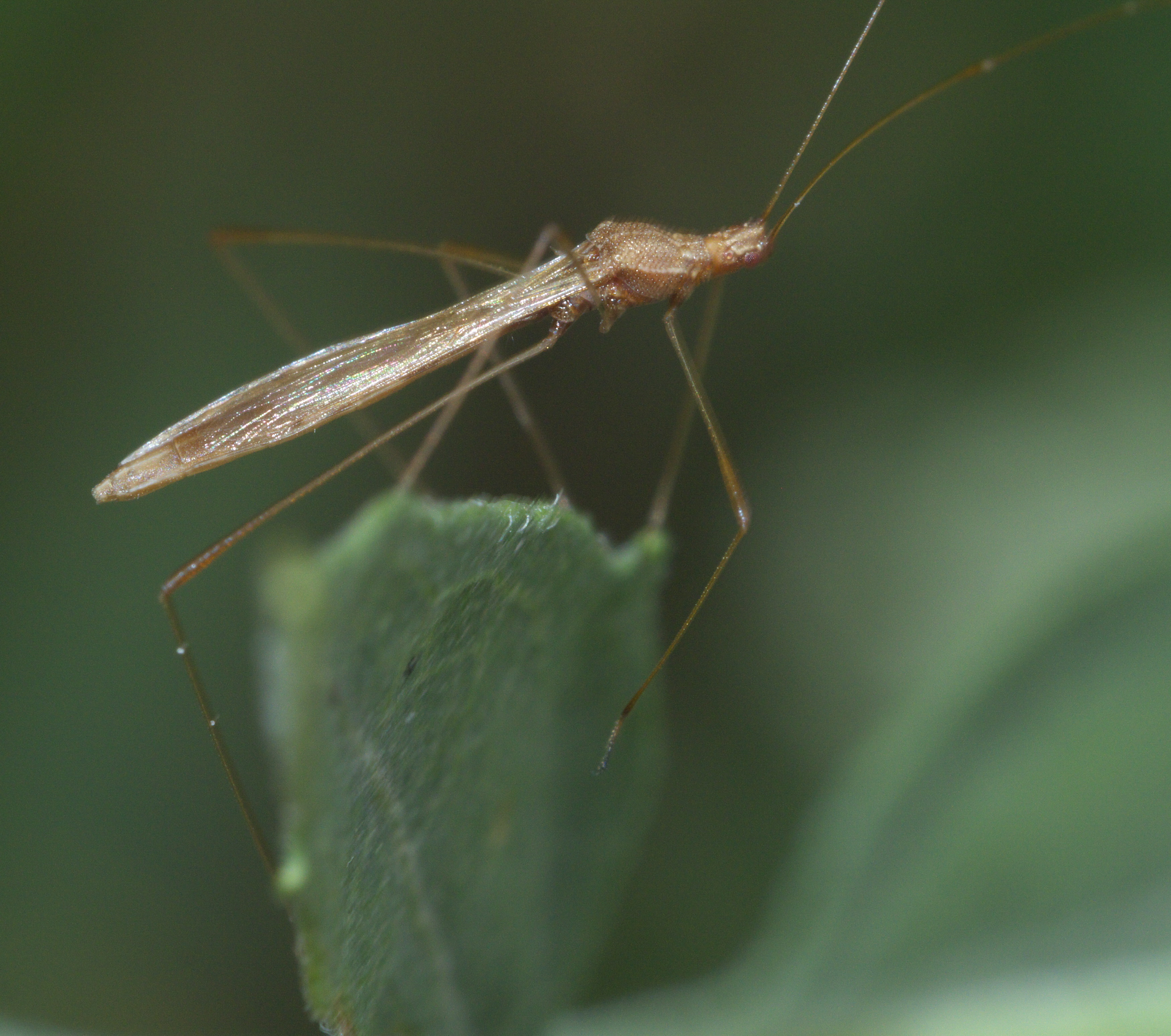

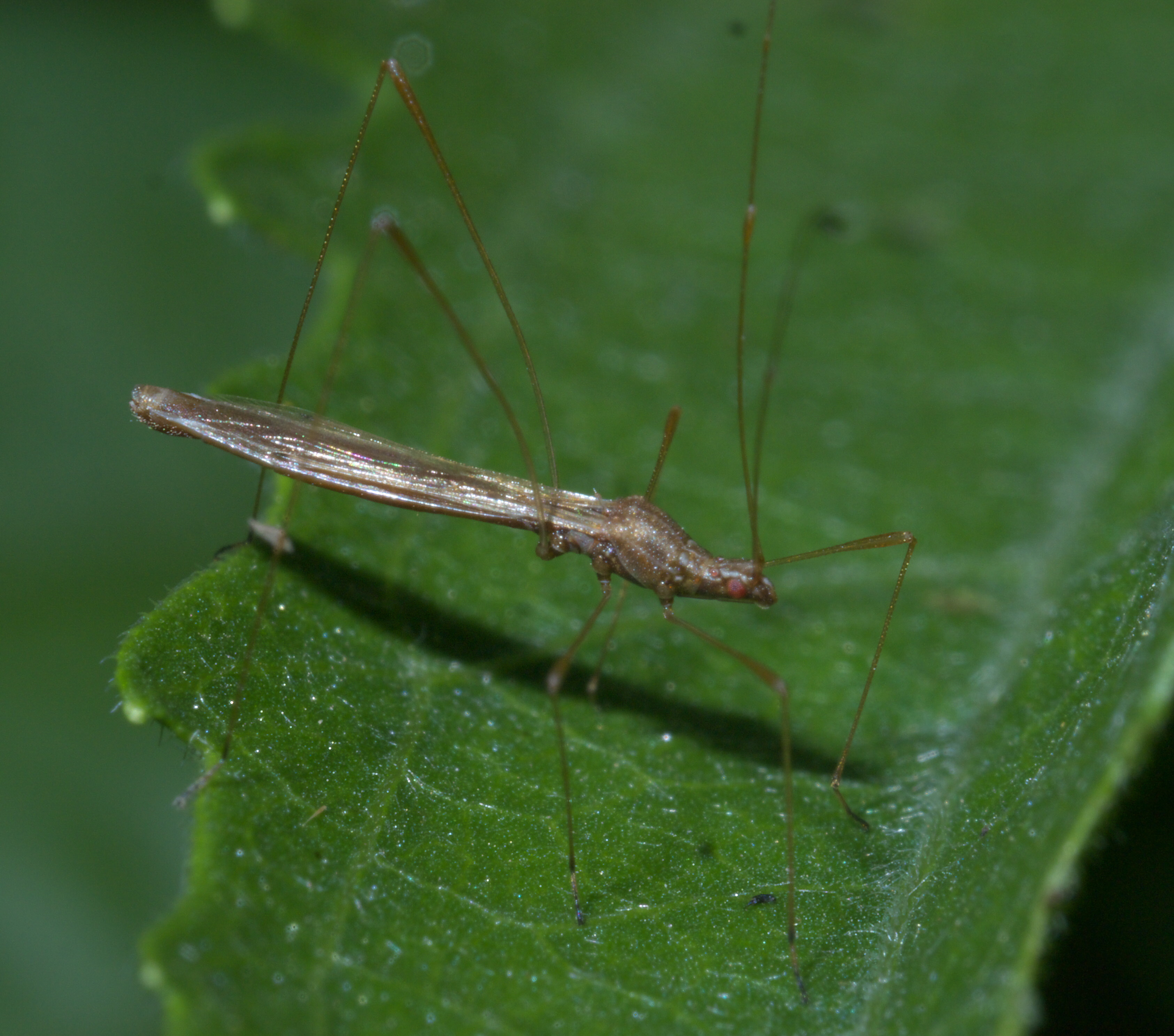

== Genera ==
These 12 genera belong to the subfamily Metacanthinae:

- Cametanthus Stusak, 1967
- Capyella Breddin, 1907
- Dimorphoberytus Stusak, 1965
- Jalysus Stal, 1862
- Metacanthus Costa, 1847
- Metatropis Fieber, 1859
- Neostusakia Kment, Henry & Frýda, 2009
- Pneustocerus Horvath, 1905
- Tirybenus Stusak, 1964
- Triconulus Horvath, 1905
- Yemma Horvath, 1905
- Yemmalysus Stusak, 1972
