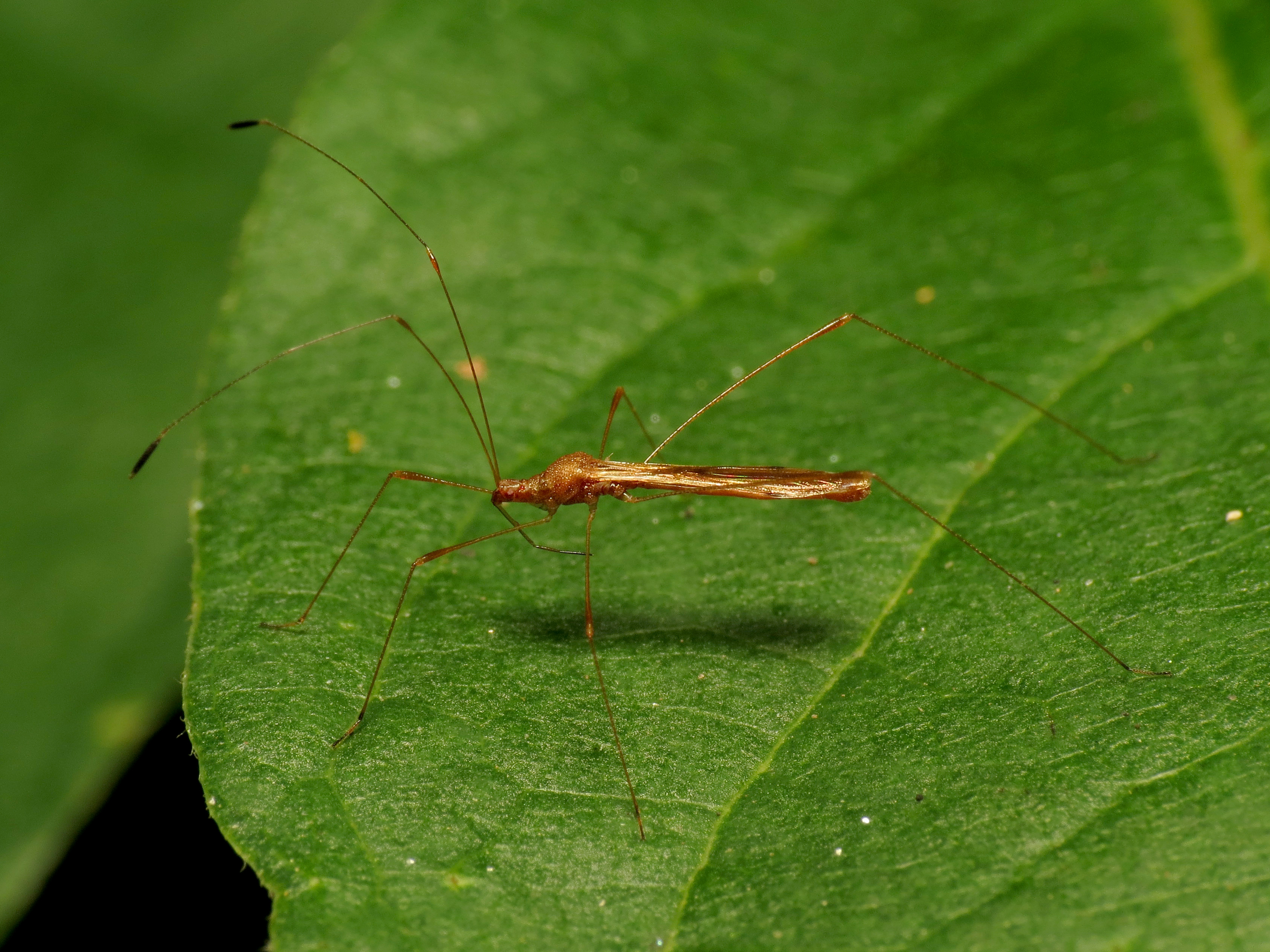

Scientific classification
- Kingdom: Animalia
- Phylum: Arthropoda
- Clade: Pancrustacea
- Class: Insecta
- Order: Hemiptera
- Suborder: Heteroptera
- Infraorder: Pentatomomorpha
- Superfamily: Lygaeoidea
- Family: Berytidae; Fieber, 1851

Synonyms
- Neididae Kirkaldy, 1902; Berytinidae Southwood and Leston, 1959

= Berytidae =

Stilt bugs

Family of true bugs

Berytidae is a family of the order Hemiptera ("true bugs"), commonly called stilt bugs or thread bugs (not to be confused with the thread-legged bugs, Emesinae). Most berytids are brown to yellow, with species that are plant sap feeders, a few being predaceous. About 200 species are known from all around the world and they are classified into three subfamilies.

== Description ==
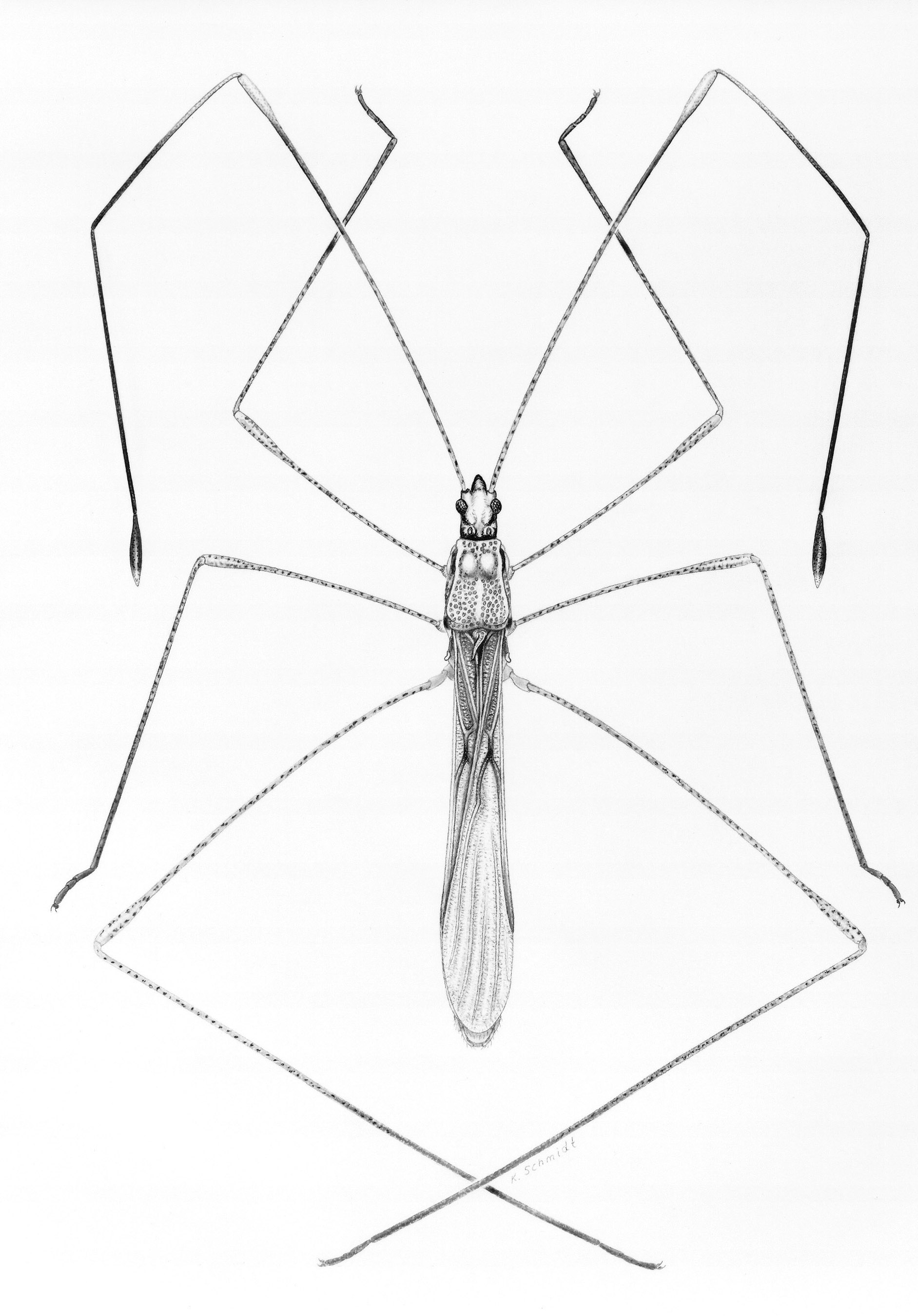
Dorsal view of a typically gracile species in the family Berytidae

The Berytidae are extremely gracile insects with legs so long and slender as to suggest common names such as "thread bugs" and "stilt bugs". In this they resemble the Emesinae, with which they are easily confused, though they are in different families. They may be distinguished most readily by the forelegs, that in the Emesinae are raptorial in a way resembling those of the Mantodea, Mantispidae and certain other invertebrate predators. In form and function the forelegs of the Berytidae are roughly similar to those of their other legs. Other differences are subtler and not fully consistent. For one thing, the antennae of most Berytidae though long, geniculate, and in other ways generally similar to Emesinae, tend to have a more or less obvious swelling at the tip. Some members of the family also have slight swellings at the distal ends of the femora of their legs, though in many species this is either absent or not obvious. The head often has a forward-facing protrusion between the antennae bases. The wing membrane has five veins and can be hard to examine in short-winged forms. Some species have spine like protrusions emerging at the base of the forewings which have a pore through which chemicals are secreted. Many species have split or toothed claws which apparently allow, along with the long legs, these bugs to overcome plant defenses involving stick hair on their surfaces. Many species are not purely plant-sap feeding and will opportunistically scavenge on insects trapped on the surfaces of sticky-haired plants. They typically probe all surfaces and can inflict a painful prick on the human skin as well.

== Biology ==
The habits of most species are not well known. Most are believed to be sap-suckers like most other Hemiptera, but some also feed on mites and small insects.

== Subfamilies and selected genera ==
Three subfamilies are usually recognised:

=== Berytinae ===
tribe Berytini Fieber, 1851

- Apoplymus Fieber, 1859
- Arideneides Tatarnic, 2022
- Bezu Stusak, 1989
- Chinoneides Stusak, 1989
- Neides Latreille, 1802
- Neoneides Stusak, 1989
- Yemmatropis Hsiao, 1977

tribe Berytinini Southwood & Leston, 1959

- Berytinus Kirkaldy, 1900

=== Gampsocorinae ===
Southwood and Leston, 1959

- Bajacanthus Henry & Wall, 2019
- Gampsocoris Fuss, 1852
- Hoplinus Stal, 1874
- Pronotacantha Uhler, 1893

=== Metacanthinae ===
Douglas and Scott, 1865

- Capyella Breddin, 1907
- Jalysus Stal, 1862
- Metacanthus Costa, 1847
- Metatropis Fieber, 1859
- Yemma Horvath, 1905

=== Unplaced genera ===
- Acanthophysa Uhler, 1893
- Aknisus McAtee, 1919
- Protacanthus Uhler, 1894
- Paleologus Distant, 1902

== Gallery ==
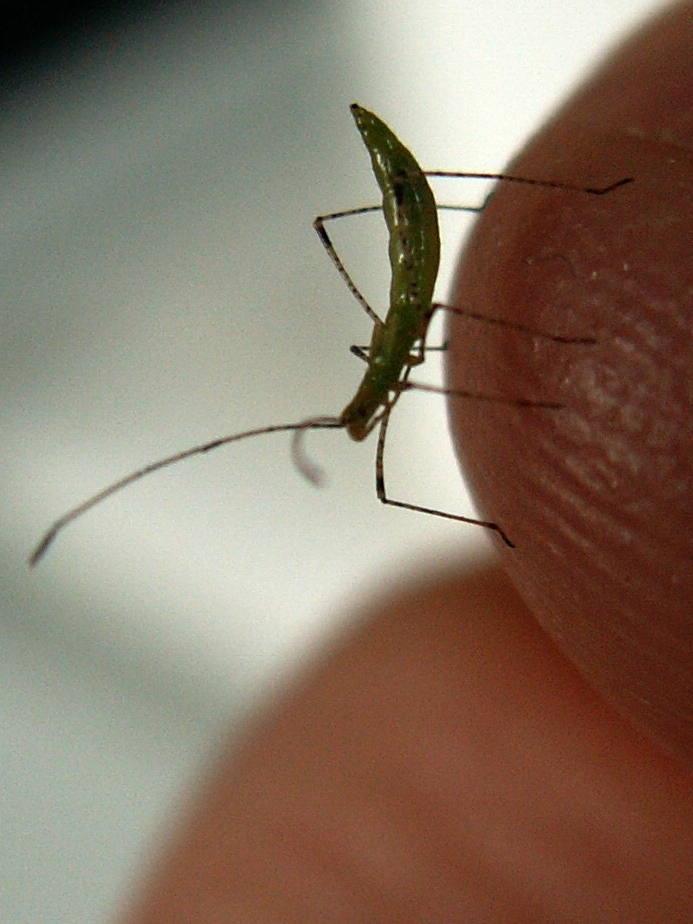
Stilt bug, possibly juvenile?

Unknown species

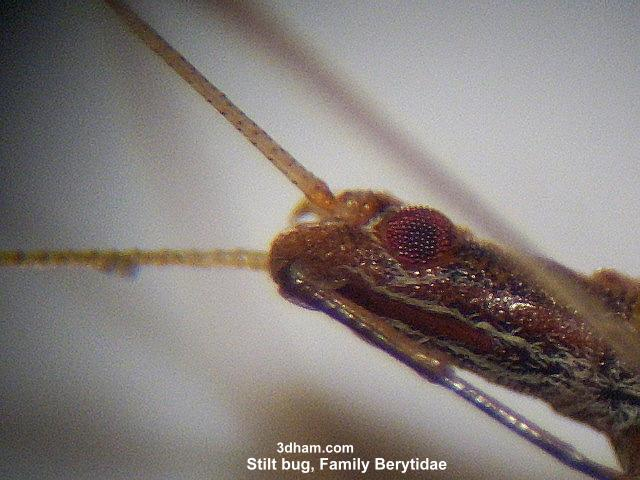
Stilt bug

Metatropis rufescens in copula

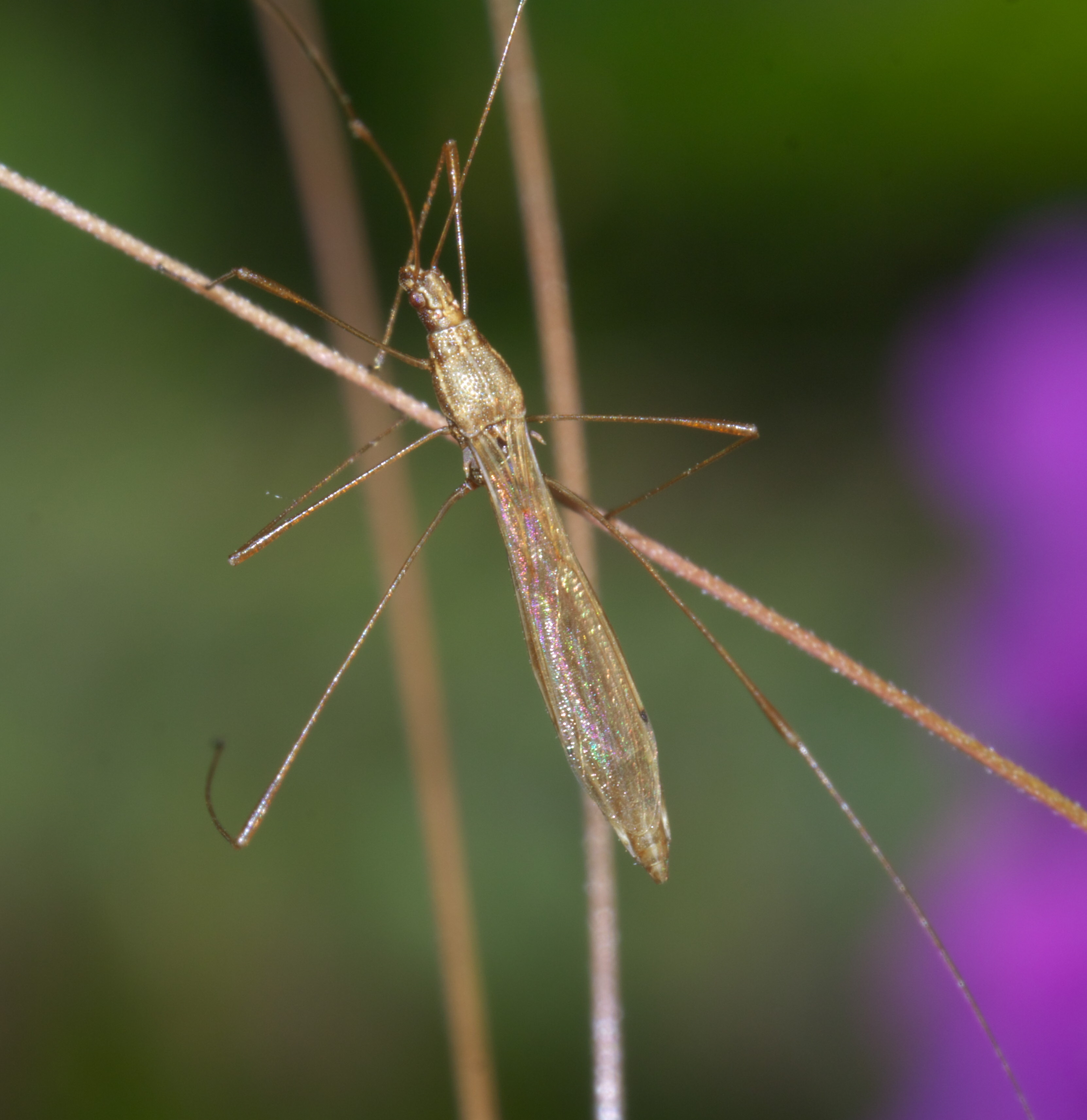
Stilt bug, Berytidae
