= Grade I listed buildings in Forest Heath =

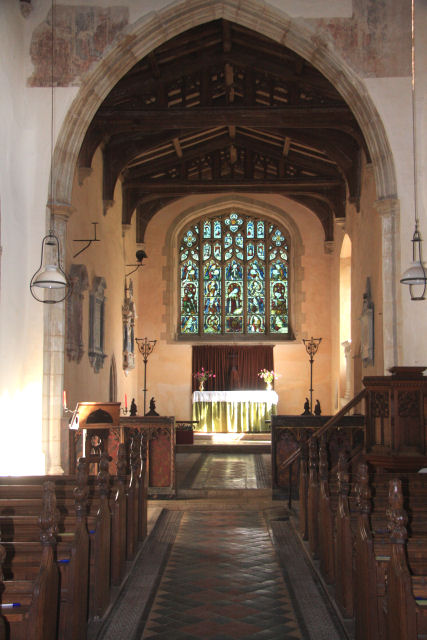
Interior of St Mary's Church in Dalham.

There are 12 Grade I listed buildings in Forest Heath, a former non-metropolitan district of Suffolk, England.

In the United Kingdom, the term listed building refers to a building or other structure officially designated as being of "exceptional architectural or historic special interest"; Grade I structures are those considered to be "buildings of exceptional interest, sometimes considered to be internationally important. Just 2.5% of listed buildings are Grade I." The total number of listed buildings in England is 372,905. In England, the authority for listing under the Planning (Listed Buildings and Conservation Areas) Act 1990 rests with English Heritage, a non-departmental public body sponsored by the Department for Culture, Media and Sport.

Forest Heath was a local government district, subdivided among 22 civil parishes, including 3 towns, that are in order of population Newmarket, Mildenhall and Brandon. Mildenhall was the administrative headquarters of the district. In 2019 it was abolished and became part of West Suffolk.

== Forest Heath ==
| Name | Location | Type | Completed (Note: The date given is the date used by Historic England as significant for the initial building or that of an important part in the structure's description.) | Date designated | Grid ref. (Note: Sometimes known as OSGB36, the grid reference is based on the British national grid reference system used by the Ordnance Survey.) Geo-coordinates | Entry number (Note: The "List Entry Number" is a unique number assigned to each listed building and scheduled monument by Historic England.) | Image | Ref. |
|---|---|---|---|---|---|---|---|---|
| Church of St Peter | Brandon | Church | Medieval | 7 May 1954 | TL7770786173; 52°26′41″N 0°36′48″E | 1037592 | Church of St Peter More images | |
| Church of St Mary | Dalham | Church | 15th century | 7 May 1954 | TL7242962556; 52°14′03″N 0°31′25″E | 1037701 | Church of St Mary More images | |
| Church of St Martin | Exning | Church | 14th century | 28 November 1950 | TL6214065513; 52°15′50″N 0°22′28″E | 1374828 | Church of St Martin More images | |
| Church of All Saints | Gazeley | Church | 14th century | 7 May 1954 | TL7193264164; 52°14′56″N 0°31′02″E | 1037675 | Church of All Saints More images | |
| Church of All Saints | Icklingham | Church | 14th century | 7 May 1954 | TL7757572606; 52°19′22″N 0°36′15″E | 1351332 | Church of All Saints More images | |
| Church of St Mary | Lakenheath | Church | 15th century | 7 May 1954 | TL7145382744; 52°24′57″N 0°31′11″E | 1285945 | Church of St Mary More images | |
| Church of St Mary | Mildenhall | Church | 15th century | 7 May 1954 | TL7102674598; 52°20′34″N 0°30′33″E | 1037561 | Church of St Mary More images | |
| Church of St Peter | Moulton | Church | 15th century | 7 May 1954 | TL6996864145; 52°14′57″N 0°29′18″E | 1037681 | Church of St Peter More images | |
| Church of St Mary | Santon Downham | Church | 13th century | 7 May 1954 | TL8162487612; 52°27′23″N 0°40′18″E | 1351353 | Church of St Mary More images | |
| Cross-base 2 Metres North West of Church of St Mary | Santon Downham | Cross | Late Medieval | 2 October 1984 | TL8161687625; 52°27′23″N 0°40′17″E | 1285595 | Cross-base 2 Metres North West of Church of St Mary More images | |
| Church of St Mary | Tuddenham | Church | 14th century | 7 May 1954 | TL7380471362; 52°18′46″N 0°32′54″E | 1037584 | Church of St Mary More images | |
| Church of All Saints | Worlington | Church | 14th century | 7 May 1954 | TL6912873856; 52°20′12″N 0°28′52″E | 1037585 | Church of All Saints More images | |

== See also ==
- List of Grade I listed buildings in Suffolk
- Grade II* listed buildings in Forest Heath
