= West Stow Heath =

Protected area in Suffolk, England

Coordinates: 52.31°N 0.63°E

- Site of Special Scientific Interest
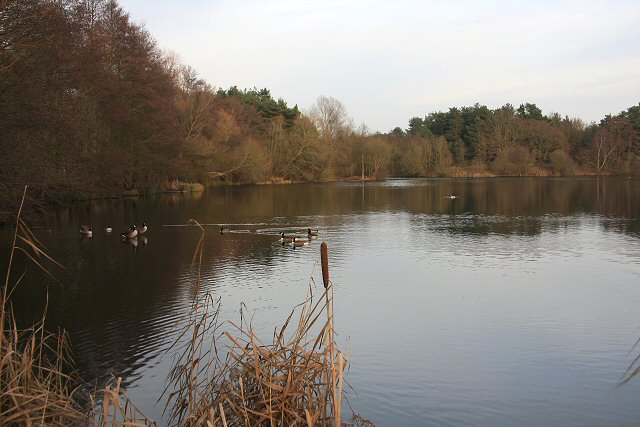
- West Stow Lake
- Location of West Stow Heath.
- Area of search: Suffolk
- Grid reference: TL 792 714
- Interest: Biological
- Area: 44.3 hectares
- Notification date: 1983
- Location map: Magic Map

West Stow Heath is a 44.3-hectare (109-acre) biological Site of Special Scientific Interest west of West Stow in Suffolk. It is part of the Breckland Special Protection Area under the European Union Directive on the Conservation of Wild Birds.

This site has diverse habitats with grassland, heath, wet woodland, scrub, dry woodland and former gravel workings which are now open water. The grassland has three nationally rare plants, glaucous fescue, Thymus serpyllum and spring speedwell.

There is access by footpaths, including from the adjoining West Stow Anglo-Saxon Village.
