= Icklingham =

Village in Suffolk, England

Coordinates: 52.31°N 00.59°E

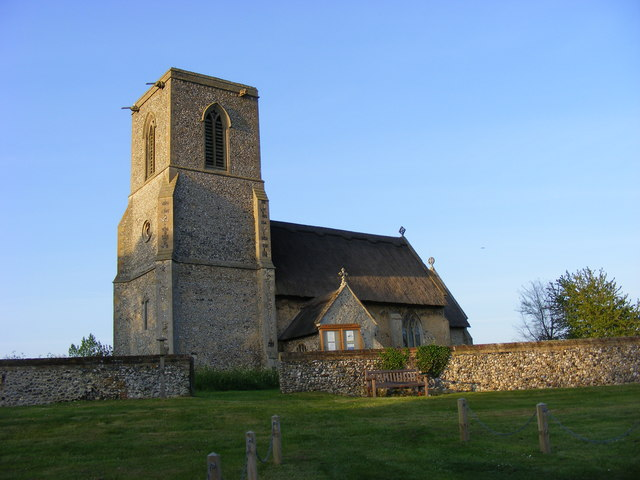
- All Saints Church, Icklingham

- Location within Suffolk
- Population: 423 (2011 Census)
- OS grid reference: TL7772
- District: West Suffolk
- Shire county: Suffolk
- Region: East
- Country: England
- Sovereign state: United Kingdom
- Post town: Bury St Edmunds
- Postcode district: IP28
- Police: Suffolk
- Fire: Suffolk
- Ambulance: East of England
- UK Parliament: West Suffolk

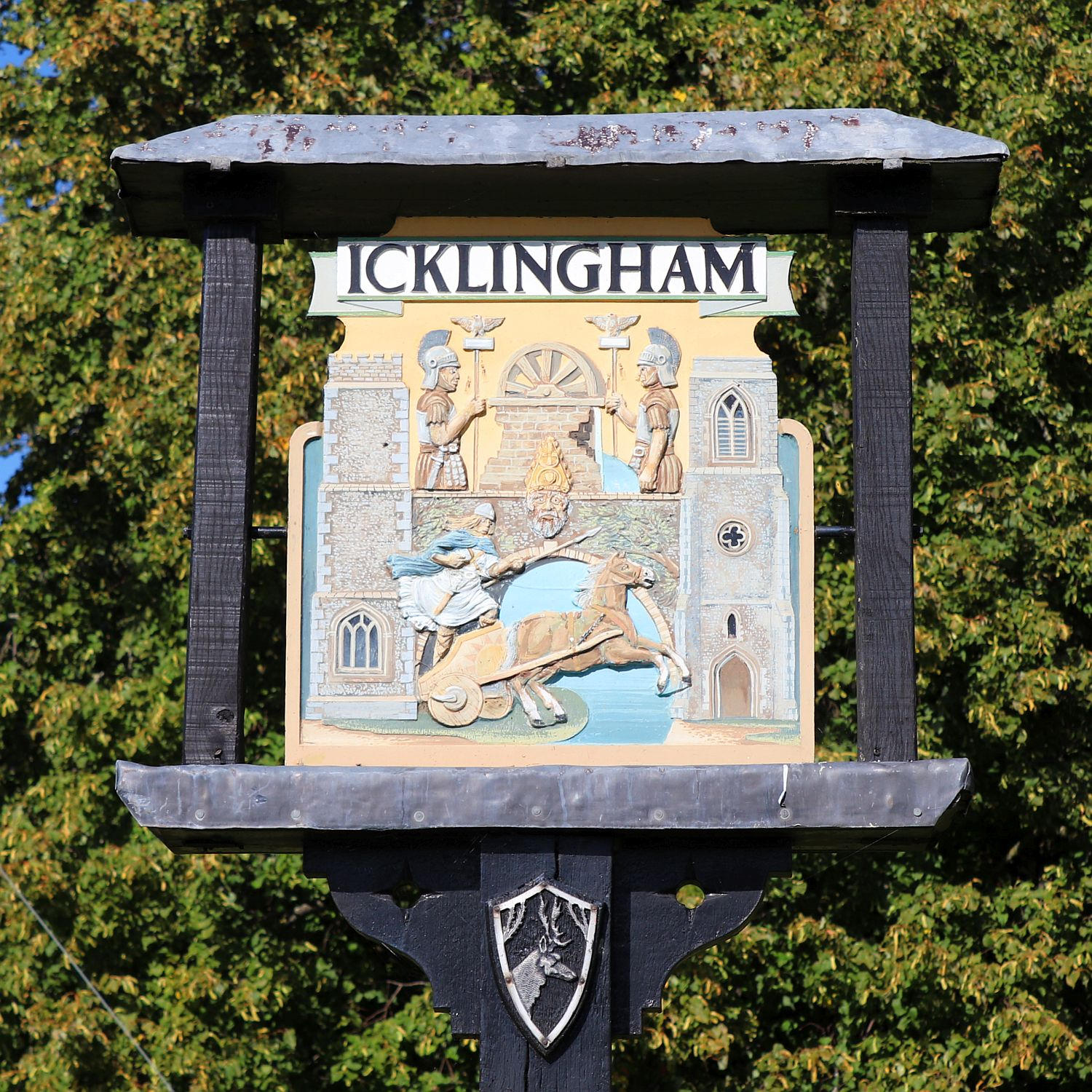
Icklingham Village Sign

Icklingham is a village and civil parish in the West Suffolk district of Suffolk in eastern England. It is located about 7 miles (11 km) north-west of Bury St Edmunds, 4 miles (6.4 km) south-east of Mildenhall and 9 miles (14 km) south-west of Thetford in Norfolk. The village is on the A1101 road between Bury St Edmunds and Mildenhall in the north-west of the county. The area around the village, characterised by a sandy gravel-laden soil, is known as Breckland, though an arm of the fen-like peat follows the River Lark past the village.

The village straddles the River Lark, a tributary to the Great Ouse. It was once navigable up to Bury St Edmunds, with locks installed; these are now redundant, and the remains of at least one lock being visible near Icklingham. The river is the reason for the siting of Icklingham's most prominent industry, the local flour mill. There are two churches in the village: St. James, and All Saints Church, Icklingham, which is of Norman in origin and a Grade I listed building.

The village is characterised by flint and pale brick cottages. There were two thriving public houses, including the magnificent thatched Red Lion, in the village, but they both closed. However, in October 2019, the Red Lion was re-opened as the Guinness Arms. A village shop no longer exists, and the village hall, the former School House, is now in private hands.

The village contains 11 listed buildings.

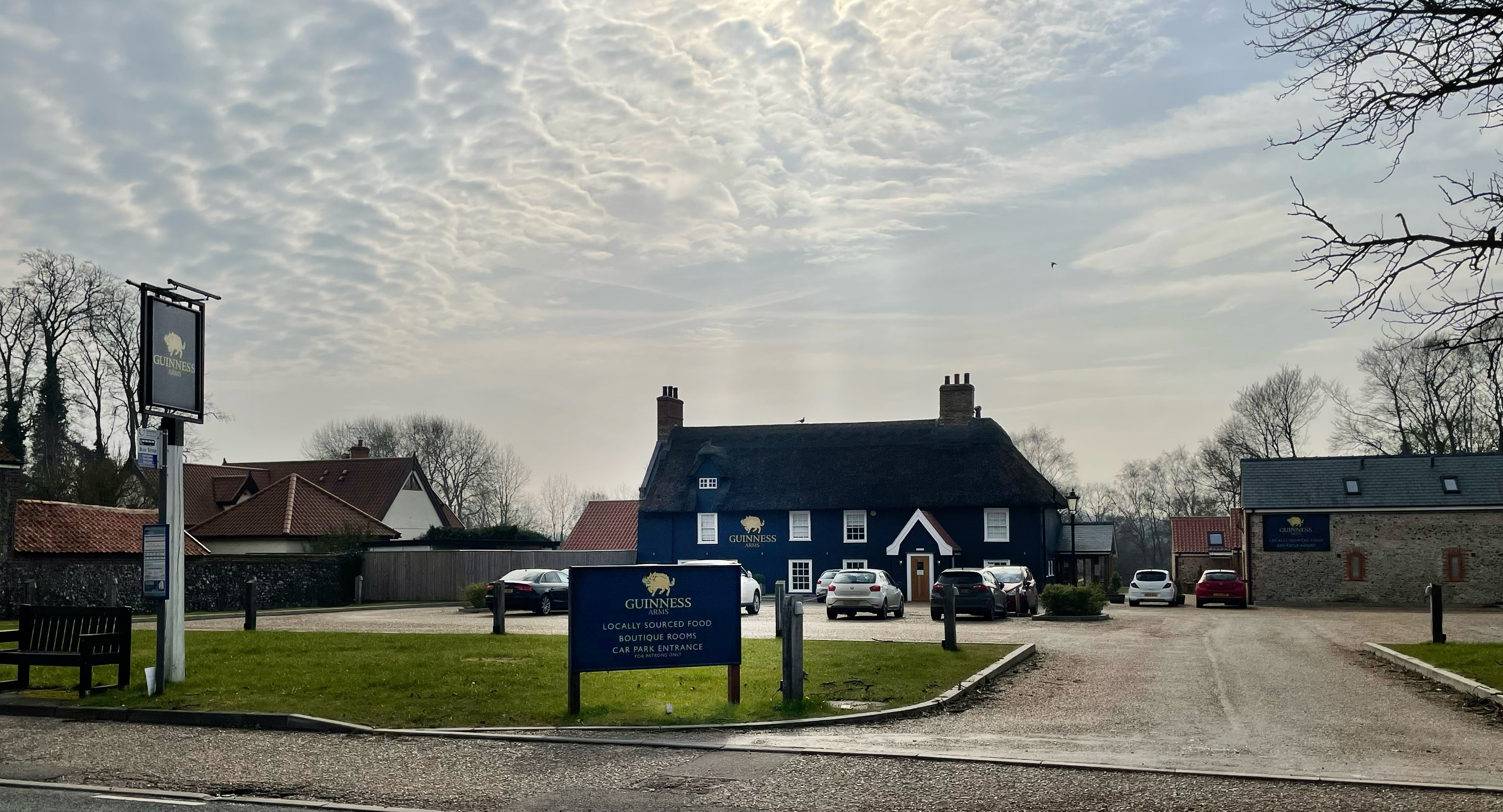
The Guinness Arms pub, Icklingham

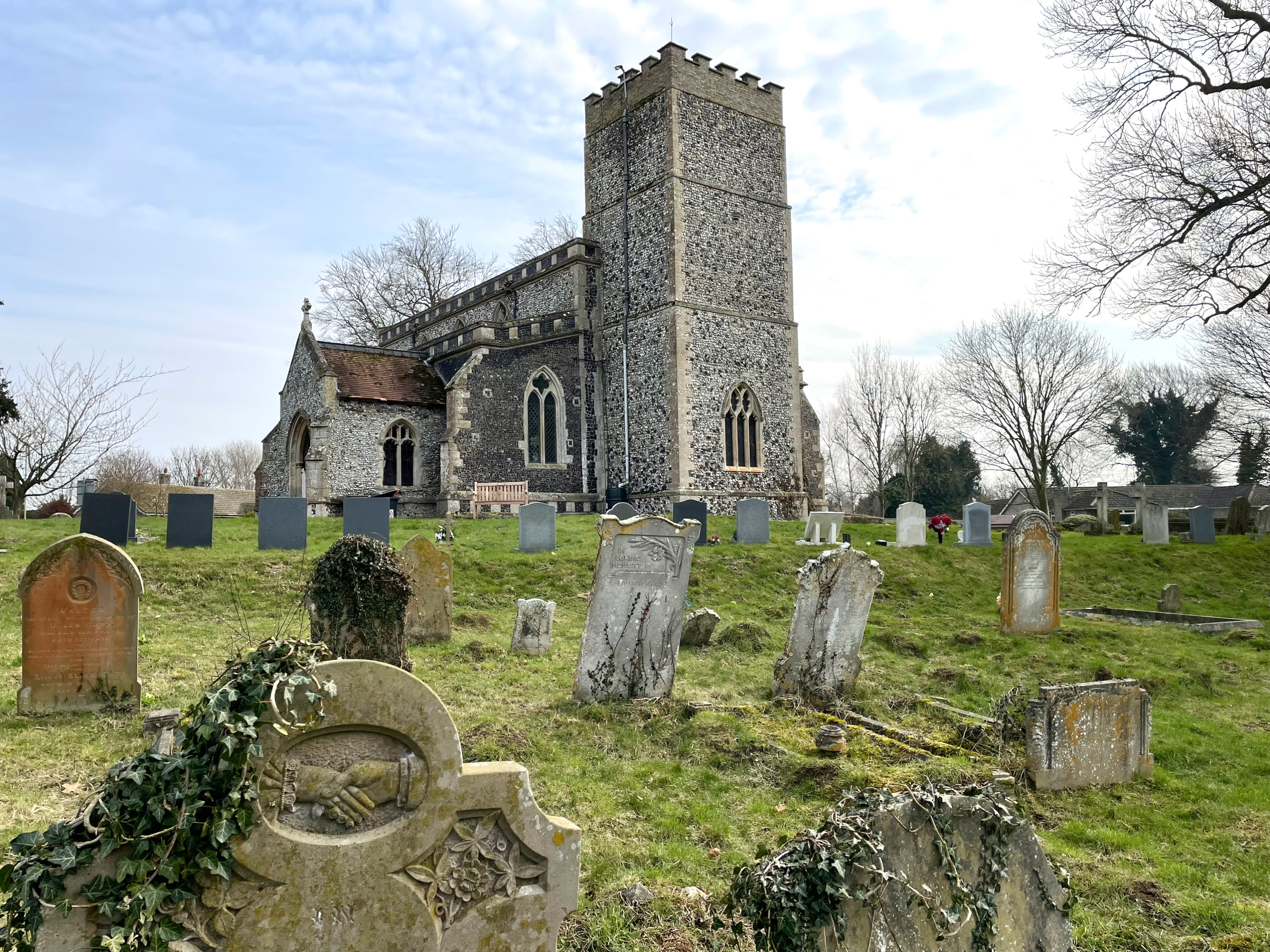
St James Church, Icklingham

== Etymology ==
The origin and meaning of the name Icklingham has been the subject of much debate and has eldued any conclusive interpretation. Three factors have contributed to this: the passage of the Icknield Way along the eastern boundary of the parish, the presence of a substantial Romano-British settlement and the presence of an Anglo-Saxon settlement close to the village in neighbouring West Stow. The antiquarian John Horsley first identified the passage of the Icknield Way near Icklingham, but refused to speculate as regards the etymology of this ancient road.

The discovery of Romano-British artefacts since the 1720's, with more rigorous excavations in the twentieth century encouraged the view that the village may take its name from an Iron Age tribe, the Iceni, who lived in the area and subsequently in the Roman settlement. An alternative etymology favoured the Old English Iclingaham as "home of the Iclingas" appears to derive from the royal house descended from Icel of Angeln, which would give rise to kings of both East Anglia and Mercia.

== History ==
There are the remains of a Roman settlement, known as Camboricum to the south-east of the village.

Icklingham has a Roman Christian graveyard, and a lead receptacle, reputed to be a baptismal font, was found on the same site. It is now located in the British Museum.

It was also one of the largest Anglo-Saxon settlements in the area and can demonstrate nearby occupation to Neolithic times, through research carried out by Liverpool University over many years. The Black Ditches boundary ditch runs to the south of the village and is believed to be the most easterly of a series of early Anglo-Saxon defensive earthworks built across the Icknield Way.

From 1808 to 1814 Icklingham was the site of a station in the shutter telegraph chain which connected the Admiralty in London to its naval ships in the port of Great Yarmouth. It has been said that on a clear day, a message could reach Great Yarmouth from The Admiralty in London, and receive a reply, in little more than 17 minutes. The horse-borne messenger would take three days at best.

== Natural environment ==
Icklingham is within the area known as Breckland, an area of sandy heaths and forests. This area has a number of important natural habitats, including for the protected stone curlew. The village is surrounded by the Breckland Farmland Site of Special Scientific Interest and close to the Breckland Forest SSSI, both of which cover large area of Breckland and are two of the largest SSSI areas in England.

The Icknield Way Path passes through the village on its 110-mile journey from Ivinghoe Beacon in Buckinghamshire to Knettishall Heath in Suffolk. The Icknield Way Trail, a multi-user route for walkers, horse riders and off-road cyclists also passes through the village. In the first half of the 19th century, great bustards were occasionally seen around Icklingham before they became extinct in the British Isles.

A number of smaller SSSI areas are found in the Icklingham area. These include Berner's Heath, the largest area of heather heathland in Breckland at 149.6 hectares (369.7 acres), and Deadman's Grave, a grassland heath area of 126.3 hectares (312.1 acres), both of which are north of the village. Cavenham-Icklingham Heaths, to the south-east of the village, is 418.8 hectares (1,034.9 acres) in area and includes a number of woodland habitats. All contain rare species such as Rosser's sac spider (Clubiona rosserae) and the soldier-fly (Odontomyia angulata) as well as stone curlew and plant species such as Breckland wild thyme (Thymus serpyllum) and spring speedwell (Veronica verna).

== See also ==
- List of Sites of Special Scientific Interest in Suffolk
