= Brandon, Suffolk =

Town in Suffolk, England

Coordinates: 52.4474°N 0.6242°E

Brandon
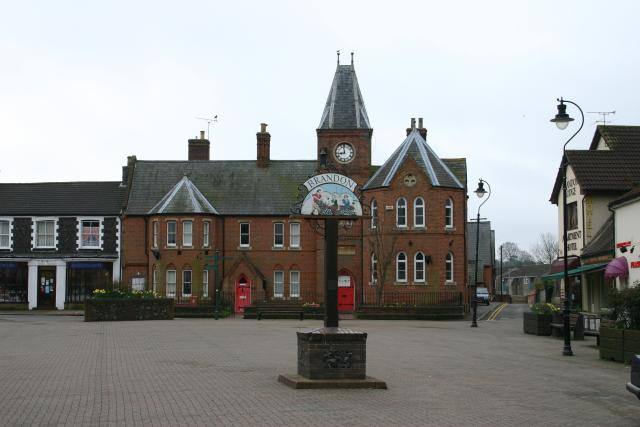
- Town square

- Location within Suffolk
- Population: 9,225 (2021 Census)
- District: West Suffolk
- Shire county: Suffolk
- Region: East
- Country: England
- Sovereign state: United Kingdom
- Post town: BRANDON
- Postcode district: IP27
- Dialling code: 01842
- Police: Suffolk
- Fire: Suffolk
- Ambulance: East of England
- UK Parliament: West Suffolk
- Website: Official website

Brandon is a town and civil parish in the English county of Suffolk. Brandon is located in the Breckland area of Suffolk in the extreme north-west of the county, close to the adjoining county of Norfolk. It lies between the towns of Bury St Edmunds, Thetford, Mildenhall, Downham Market and the city of Ely. The town is almost entirely surrounded by Thetford Forest.

Best known throughout the ages for its flint industry, Brandon was also one of the Brecks-area towns where soldiers trained during World Wars I and II. The town has had a sizeable Polish population since the end of the Second World War, when Polish Allied soldiers were resettled under the Polish Resettlement Act of 1947.

== History ==
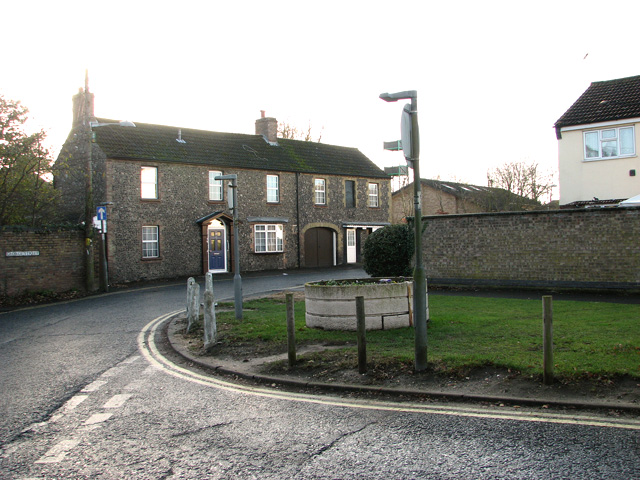
Flint houses in Brandon

Brandon, likely "hill where broom grows", has been variously referred to as Brandona, Braundon, Brandones Ferye, Brandon Ferry, Brand, and Bromdum throughout history. The earliest known spelling was in the 11th century when the town, gradually expanding up and along the rising ground of the river valley, was called Bromdun. The town was originally developed as a crossing point for the Little Ouse River.

From prehistoric times the area was mined for flint as can be seen at Grime's Graves, a Neolithic flint mining complex. At Staunch Meadow in the 1980s, archaeologists uncovered a Middle Saxon settlement thought to have been active from the mid 7th century to the late 9th century. At least thirty-five buildings were excavated. In the Middle Ages, the town had a major rabbit fur industry, which thrived until the 1950s. Brandon was still a major centre for the production of gunflints by the Napoleonic Wars. Gunflint production ended in 1945.

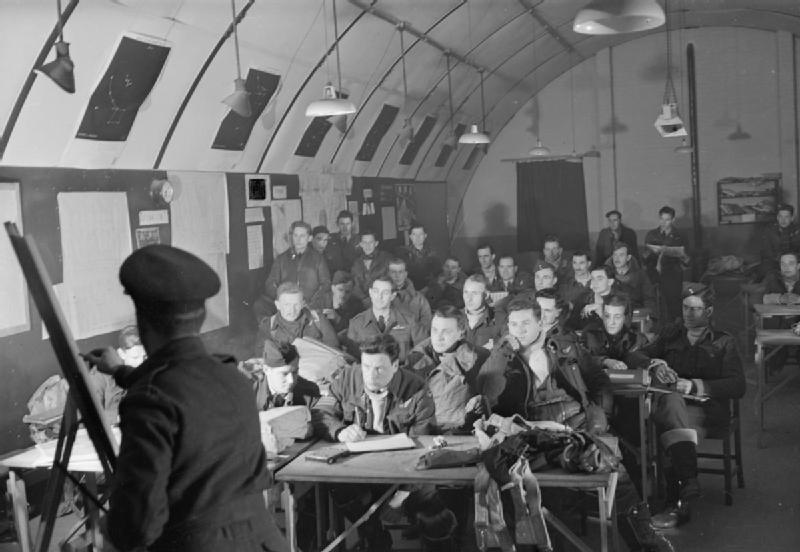
Aircrews of No. 199 Squadron RAF during a briefing at RAF Lakenheath during the Second World War

Brandon's Great Fire occurred on 14 May 1789. A fire started at the surgeon's home from either a lightning strike or by hot ash embers being blown onto the thatched roof of a wooden shed by the wind. It quickly spread to the surrounding properties, in part due to the absence of enough able-bodied young men to contain the fire, as many were at a fair day in nearby Thetford. Eleven houses were damaged and 8 of them were completely destroyed. The hardest hit was Francis Diggon, the saddler, who lost all of his property and possessions, costing a total of 381 pounds, 2 shillings.

During both world wars, the Brecks, including Brandon, Thetford, and Elveden, were used as military training grounds, in part due to the easy access from London via rail. Under the Polish Resettlement Act of 1947, displaced Polish men who fought for the Allies and their families were permitted to live in resettlement camps, where they were given industry training. Once finished, many of these families permanently settled in the Brecks area. The US Army Air Force's 3rd Air Division set up a makeshift base, Camp Blainey, in Brandon for the duration of World War II. Some Polish families displaced during the war chose to remain in Brandon and surrounding areas, where they had been living in displacement camps, when they found they were unable to return home. In 1968, the Greater London Council began developing public housing in Brandon, resulting in further expansion of the town. Brandon is adjacent to RAF Lakenheath, a Royal Air Force station in use since World War I. American families also lived in and around the town during the Cold War.

== Community ==
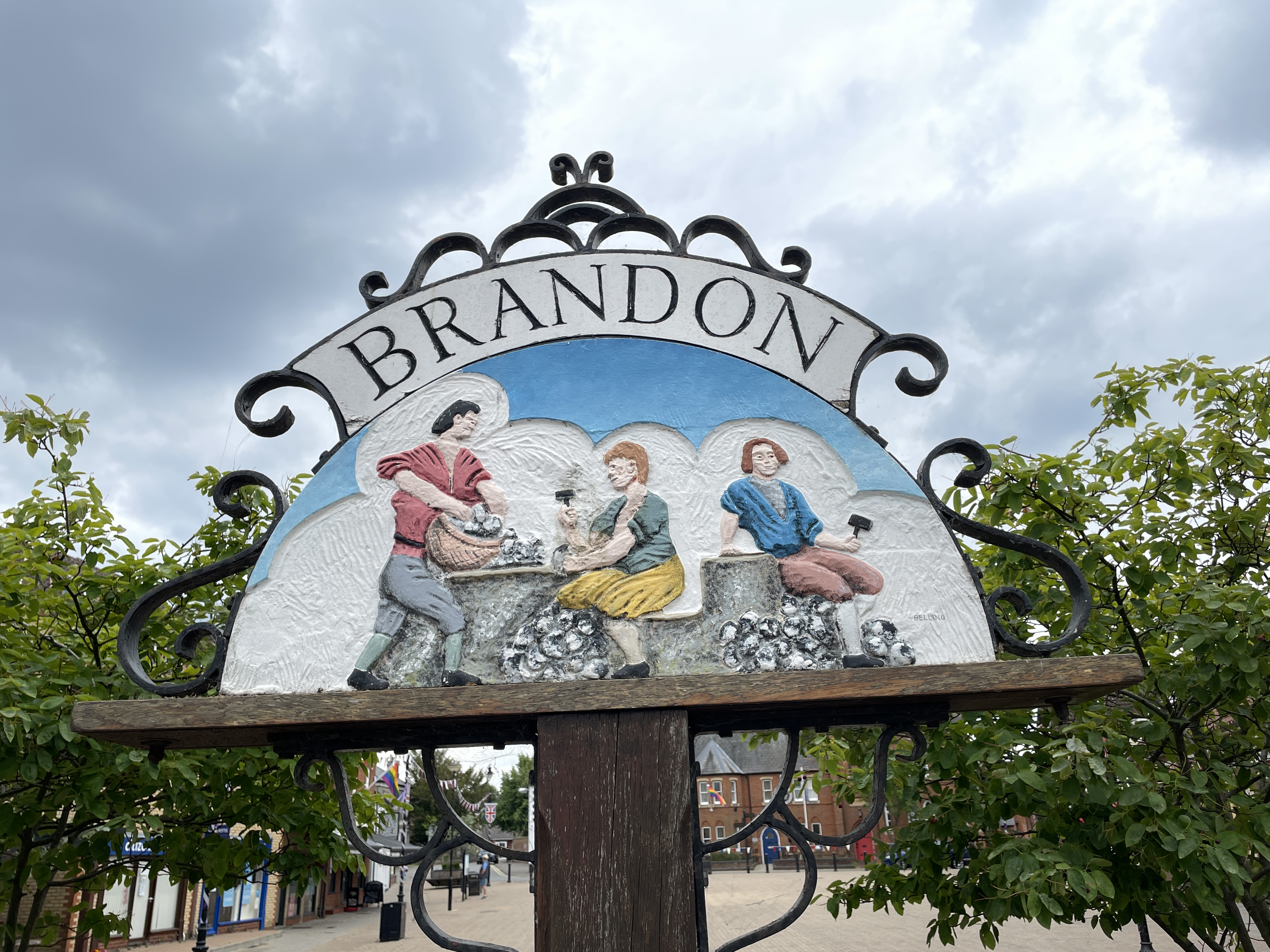
Town sign for Brandon

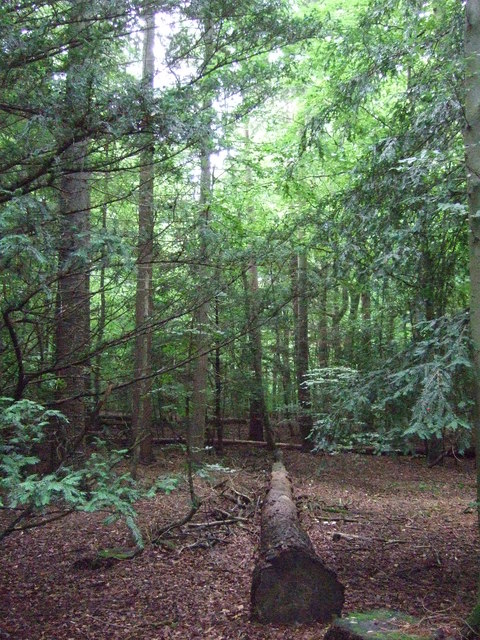
Brandon Country Park

The Domesday Book records that the Manor of Brandon in 1086 had 25 households; by 1251, the population had increased to 39 households. As of the 2021 census, there was a population of 9,225 people, up from 9,145 in 2011 and 8,256 in 2001. The median age in 2021 was 44.

Brandon Town Community FC has squads for community members ages five and up. The squads regularly compete in more than four leagues, including Ipswich & Suffolk Youth League, Norfolk Youth Combine League, Norfolk Women's, and Norfolk Youth Combined U15. The town football squad was previously the Brandon Lads and Lasses AFC. Brandon also has a lawn bowls club, Brandon Town Bowling Club, which was founded in 1949 and plays outdoors in the summer.

The town is home to Brandon Country Park and is a short distance from High Lodge which hosts musical gigs in the summer. In 2014 the volunteer group Brandon in Bloom, later Brandon in Bloom CIC, was established to green up the open spaces around the town. In 2018 the group entered Anglia in Bloom for the first time and was awarded Silver Gilt and Best Newcomer, followed by Gold in 2019. Bloom judging ceased during the lockdown period and upon restarting in 2022 Brandon managed Gold and Best in Class for the Jubilee Display, Gold for Best Garden for special needs with their Friendly Bench and George St Rose garden; and Best Town. In 2023, they won seven accolades and were chosen to represent Anglia in Britain in Bloom in the town category, for which they won Gold.

In 1810 resident Joseph Smedley was hiring a building for use as a theatre at a cost of five Guineas. Brandon's first permanent cinema was brought to the town by Stanley Lingwood in 1917 after he was pensioned out of the Army due to a severe hand wound sustained at the Somme. He purchased the cinema from Shropshire and erected it between the family home, Avenue House, and the Church Institute, along Victoria Avenue. It was a wooden building, which he called the Electric Palace, and it stayed in his possession until December 1933. At that time, he sold it to a King's Lynn businessman named Ben Culey, who had a cinema in neighbouring Thetford. Six months after Culey purchased the cinema it burnt to the ground. In February 1935 he opened another cinema on the site, which he named AVENUE. This new cinema was state of the art with the very latest projector, sound and acoustics. It proved very popular during the Second World War. He sold the theatre to Breckland Cinemas Ltd. in 1965 and by 1966 the building was half-cinema, half-bingo hall. The building became vacant in 2007 and was demolished in 2021.

=== Education and religion ===
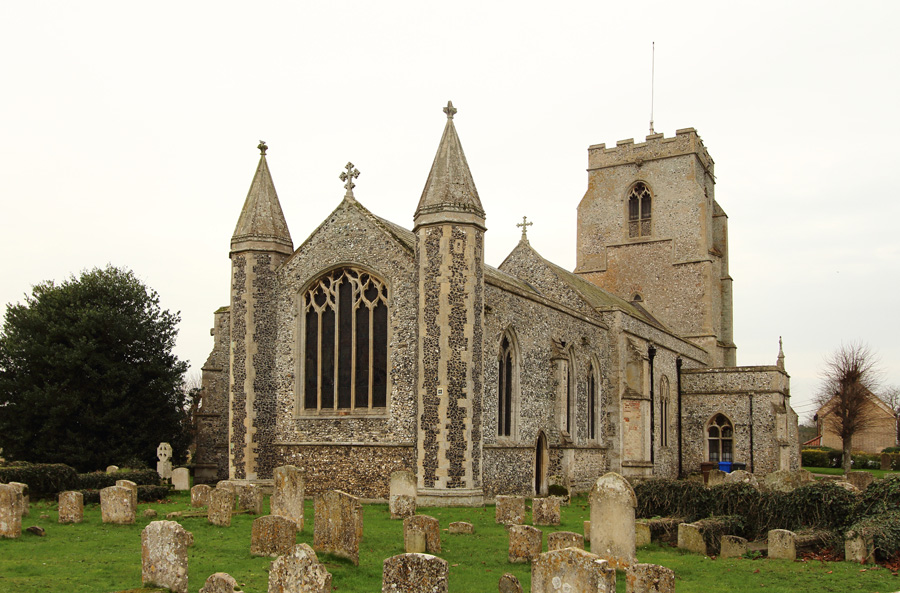
Church of St Peter, a Grade I building with medieval origins

As of 2024, Brandon has four schools: three primary, Forest Academy, Glade Academy, and Weeting Church of England Primary School; and one High School, Breckland School. There is also a children's centre, Brandon Family Hub, run by the Suffolk County Council.

There are six churches in Brandon: Ascension Church, Brandon Church of Christ, Brandon Baptist Church, Brandon Methodist Church, Church of St Peter and St Thomas of Canterbury. The Church of St Peter is a Grade I listed building of medieval origin and was restored in 1873.

=== Media ===
Local news and television programmes are provided by BBC East and ITV Anglia. Television signals are received from either the Tacolneston or Sandy Heath TV transmitters. It is also possible to receive reception from the Belmont TV transmitter which broadcasts BBC East Yorkshire and Lincolnshire and ITV Yorkshire.

Local radio stations are BBC Radio Suffolk, Heart East, Greatest Hits Radio Norfolk & North Suffolk, and RWSfm, a community-based station which broadcast from Bury St Edmunds.

The town is served by the local newspaper, The Thetford and Brandon Times, which publishes on Wednesdays.

== Transport ==
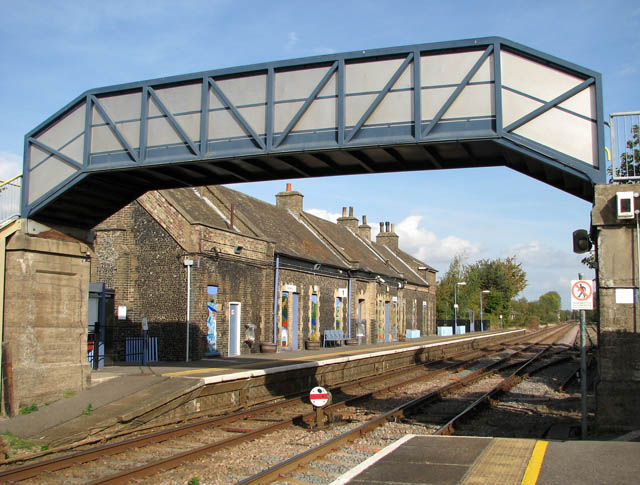
Brandon railway station

Brandon is situated on the A1065 Mildenhall to Fakenham road and serves as the main route between King's Lynn and London. It often suffers severe congestion due to large amounts of commuter traffic, holiday traffic travelling to the Norfolk Coast and HGVs. Several bus routes pass through the town as well. Regular bus services operate from Brandon to the neighbouring towns of Bury St. Edmunds, Mildenhall and Thetford. There are also infrequent services (at school and shopping times) to Downham Market, King's Lynn and Norwich.

As of February 2023 there is typically one train per hour to Norwich and one to Stansted Airport via Cambridge, operated by Greater Anglia. Brandon railway station has an hourly service to Cambridge and Ely to the West and to Thetford and Norwich in the East.

Flowing in a westerly direction, the Little Ouse river is navigable through the town.

== Notable residents ==
- Charles Crawley (1908–1935), cricketer
- Margaret Gentle Harwood (c 1925–2004), educator
- Derek Harrison (born 1959), speedway rider
- Adam Marriott (born 1991), footballer
- Natasha Preston (born 1988), novelist
- Rodney Rought-Rought (1908–1979), cricketer
