= Brandon Country Park =

Country park in Suffolk, England

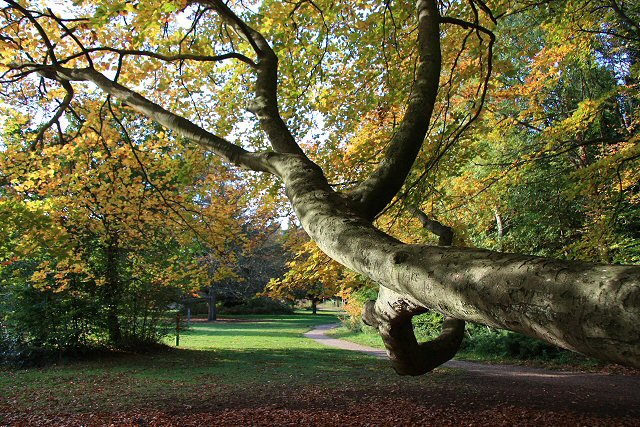
- Interactive map of Brandon Country Park
- Type: Country Park
- Location: Brandon, Suffolk, England
- Coordinates: 52.4360°N 0.6223°E
- Visitors: 175,000 annually
- Open: All year
- Website: http://www.brandoncountrypark.org.uk/

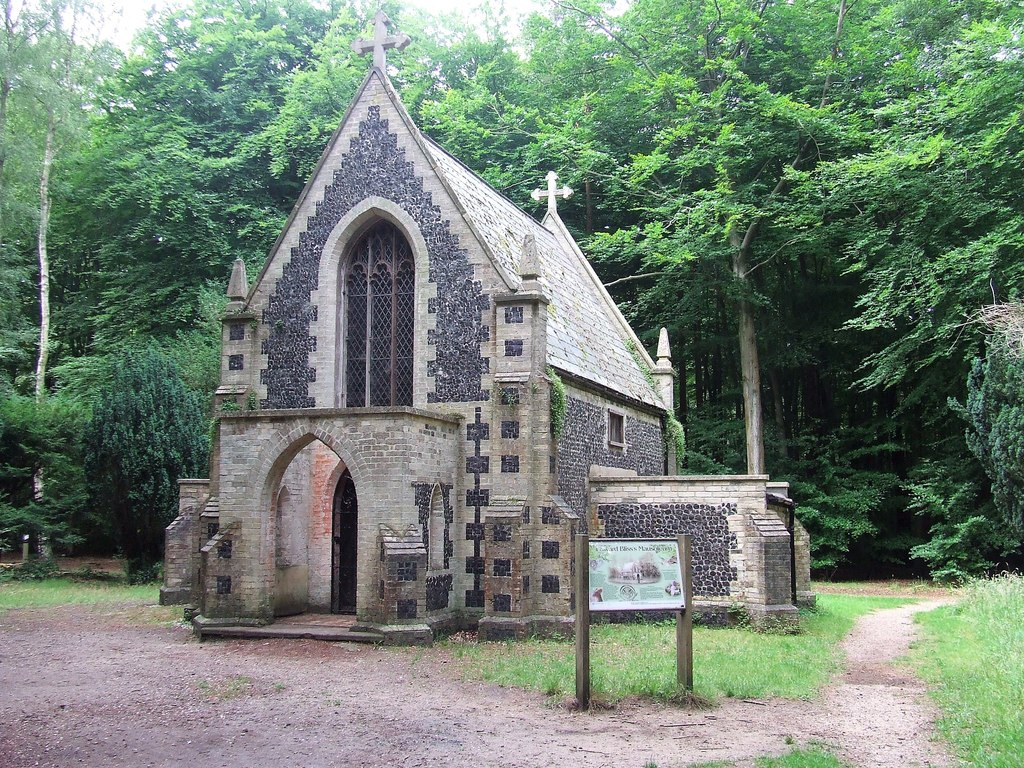
Edward Bliss's Mausoleum

Brandon Country Park is a country park in Brandon, Suffolk, England.

== History ==
In 1820 Edward Bliss bought Brandon Park house and grounds using wealth he generated from selling gun flint during the Napoleonic Wars. He built a walled garden and an arboretum with exotic species including Blue Atlas Cedar, Monkey Puzzle Trees and Giant Redwoods. In the grounds he built a Gothic mausoleum using knapped flint and surrounded by Irish Yew trees. Both Bliss and his wife were laid to rest in the mausoleum but were later moved to Brandon Cemetery. When the gun flint industry began to decline Bliss had his work force plant over 1 million trees, in the process creating Thetford Forest.

== Landmarks ==
Brandon Park house is Grade II listed with Historic England and is a privately owned nursing home.

== Facilities ==
The facilities include a cafe, walking, cycling, forest trails and walled garden. Brandon Country Park Parkrun takes place every Saturday morning, the course is through woodland and on mixed trails. In 2018 there were 175,000 visitors.
