= Stanford Training Area SSSI =

British Army training and nature conservation site

Coordinates: 52.513°N 0.754°E

- Site of Special Scientific Interest
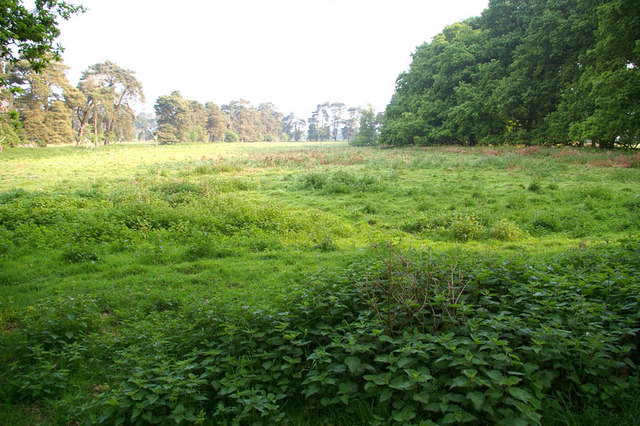
- Location of Stanford Training Area SSSI.
- Area of search: Norfolk, England
- Grid reference: TL 870 941
- Interest: Biological; Geological
- Area: 4,678.0 hectares (11,560 acres)
- Notification date: 1999
- Location map: Magic Map

Stanford Training Area SSSI is part of the British Army Stanford Training Area. It is a 4,678-hectare (11,560-acre) biological and geological Site of Special Scientific Interest north of Thetford in Norfolk, England. It is a Nature Conservation Review site and part of it is a Geological Conservation Review site. It is also part of the Breckland Special Area of Conservation and Special Protection Area.

This site contains an extensive area of species-rich Breckland grassland and heath. Wetlands and pools have wildfowl and many rare invertebrates. The Devil's Punchbowl is geologically important for its deep depression formed by the collapse of Pleistocene glacial sands and boulder clays.

Public access to the site is restricted. Part of the land area designated as Stanford Training Area SSSI is owned by the Ministry of Defence.
