= Cavenham–Icklingham Heaths =

Uk Site of Special Scientific Interest

Coordinates: 52.33°N 0.57°E

- Site of Special Scientific Interest
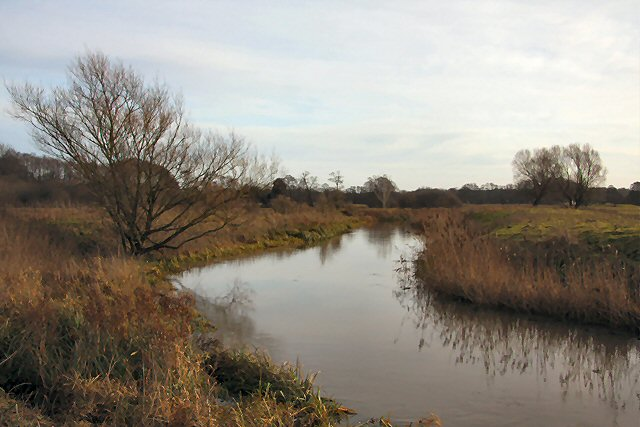
- The River Lark near Icklingham
- Location of Cavenham–Icklingham Heaths.
- Area of search: Suffolk
- Grid reference: TL 751 732
- Interest: Biological
- Area: 419.0 hectares
- Notification date: 1998
- Location map: Magic Map

Cavenham–Icklingham Heaths is a 419 hectare biological Site of Special Scientific Interest west of Icklingham in Suffolk. It is a Nature Conservation Review site, Grade I, and part of Breckland Special Area of Conservation and Breckland Special Protection Area under the European Union Directive on the Conservation of Wild Birds. Cavenham Heath is a 203.1 hectare National Nature Reserve.

This site has habitats of heath and grassland, with smaller areas of woodland and fen, in the flood-plain of the River Lark. There are lichens and mosses in areas of acid grassland. It is described by Natural England as of national importance for its invertebrate species, including some which are rare and endangered, and it also has nationally rare flora and nationally scarce bryophytes.

The site is crossed by footpaths from Icklingham.
