= Berner's Heath =

Site of scientific interest in Suffolk, England

Coordinates: 52.36°N 0.64°E

- Site of Special Scientific Interest
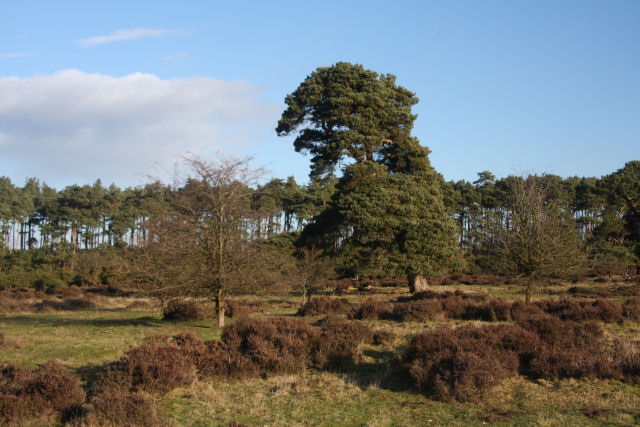
- Location of Berner's Heath.
- Area of search: Suffolk
- Grid reference: TL 797 763
- Interest: Biological
- Area: 236.9 hectares
- Notification date: 1983
- Location map: Magic Map

Berner's Heath is a 236.9-hectare (585-acre) biological Site of Special Scientific Interest north-east of Icklingham in Suffolk. It is a Nature Conservation Review site, a Special Area of Conservation, and a Special Protection Area

== War time use ==
The site was used as a high altitude bombing range from 1936 until after World War II.

== Plant and wildlife ==
The heath is the largest remaining area of heather dominated heath in the Brecks. It contains blocks of heather of different ages as a result of rotational heather burning conducted as a management strategy. Heather dominates the heath, achieving almost 100% coverage with blocks divided by rides. This allows a variety of different ground cover species to develop in different areas of the heath. In the areas of younger heather this includes species such as sheep’s sorrel Rumex acetosella and mosses such as Polytrichum juniperinum, although in areas where heather is slightly older and growing quickly ground cover is restricted. Older, established blocks of heather have greater biodiversity and include lichens as well as flowering plant species isuch as heath bedstraw Galium saxatile, lady’s bedstraw Galium verum, common speedwell Veronica officinalis and sheep’s fescue Festuca ovina. These areas also support a wide range of insect populations.

At the edges of the site, especially in the south, acidic grasslands gradually merge with the heather with a range of grass and lichen species present, dominated by sheep's fescue grass. There are some areas of chalk soils as well as an area of self-set Scots pine (Pinus sylvestris) along the southern edge of the site.

== Access ==
It is open access land and can usually be accessed between November and February to allow for ground nesting bird species to be undisturbed during the nesting season.
