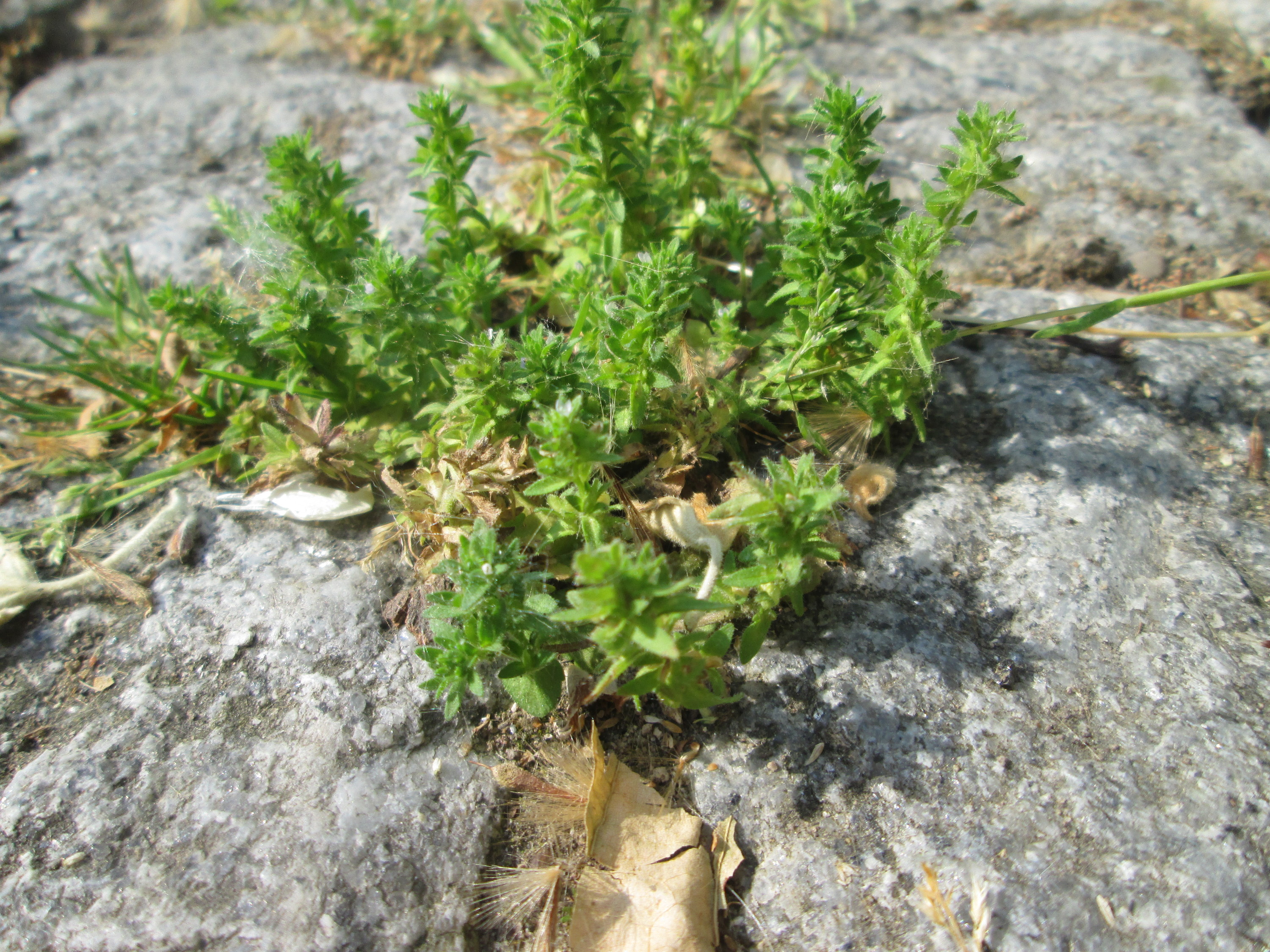

Scientific classification
- Kingdom: Plantae
- Clade: Tracheophytes
- Clade: Angiosperms
- Clade: Eudicots
- Clade: Asterids
- Order: Lamiales
- Family: Plantaginaceae
- Genus: Veronica
- Species: V. arvensis

Binomial name
- Veronica arvensis L.

Synonyms
- List: Agerella arvensis (L.) Fourr.; Cardia arvensis (L.) Dulac; Veronica acinifolia F.W.Schmidt; Veronica brevipedunculata Gilib.; Veronica demissa Samp.; Veronica depressa Kit. ex Schult.; Veronica hawaiensis H.Lév.; Veronica hirsuta Lucé; Veronica hirsuta Colenso; Veronica koeleri Roem. & Schult.; Veronica longiracemosa Colenso; Veronica nova Koeld. ex Roem.; Veronica polyanthos Thuill.; Veronica polygonoides Lam.; Veronica pseudoarvensis Tineo; Veronica racemifoliata Pérez Lara; Veronica reniformis Raf.

= Veronica arvensis =

Plant species in the veronica family

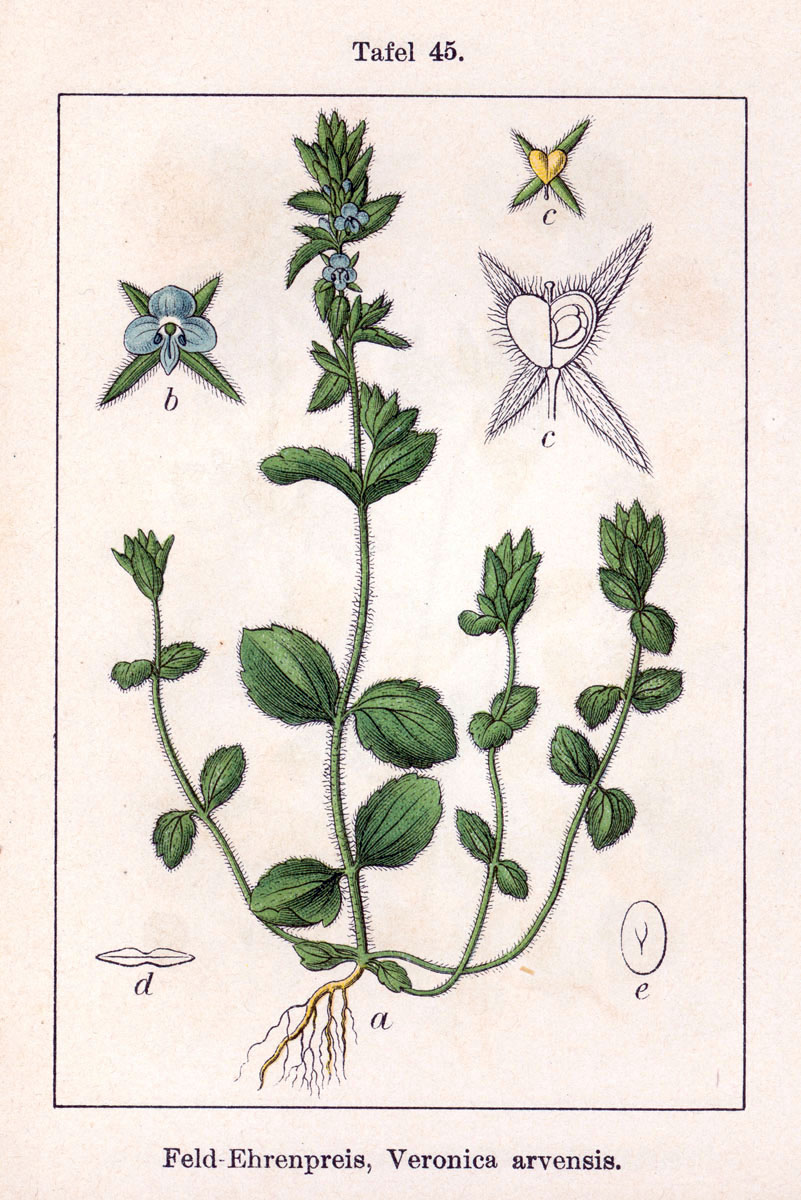

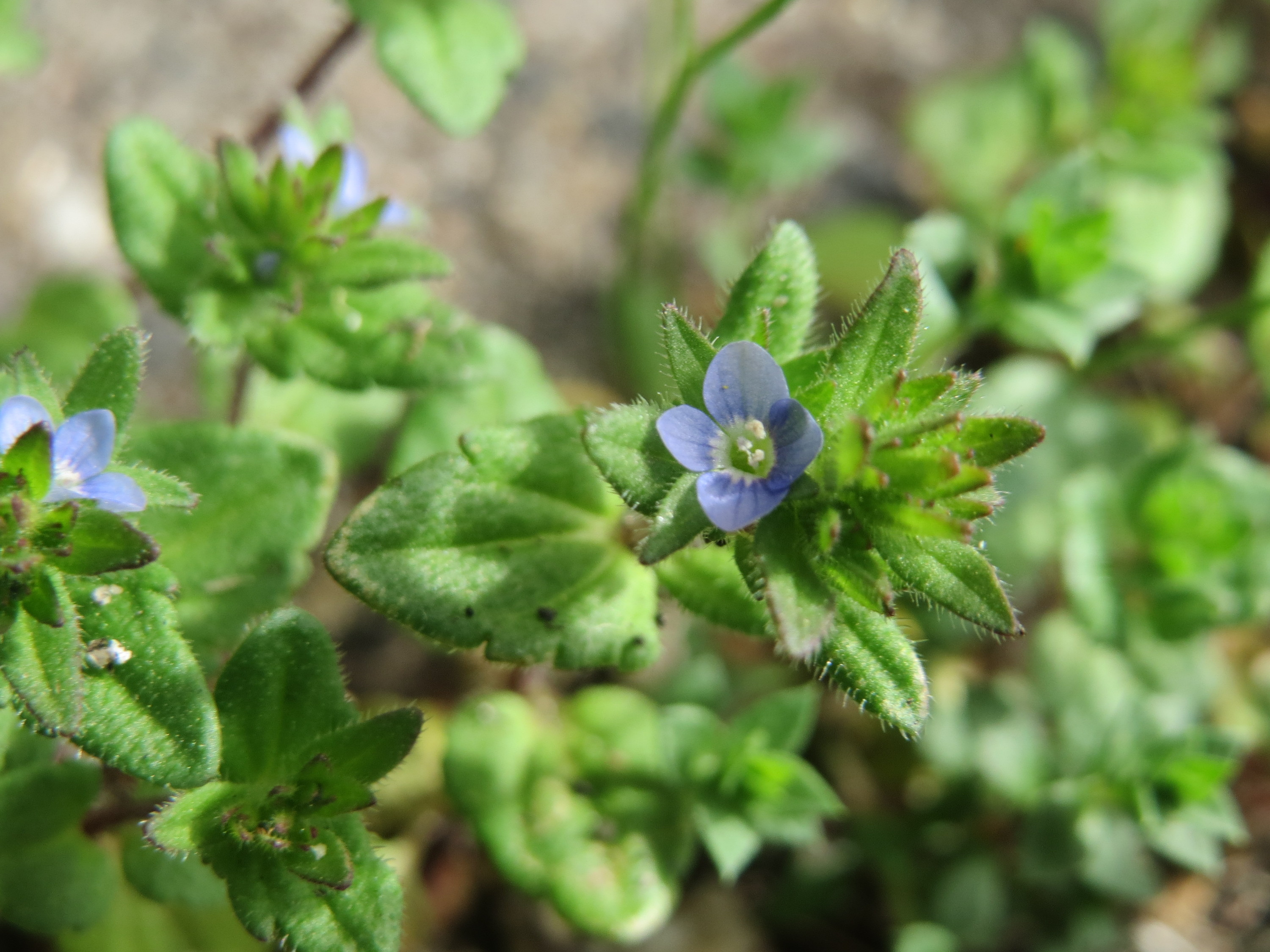

Veronica arvensis, common names: wall speedwell, corn speedwell, common speedwell, rock speedwell, field speedwell, is an annual flowering plant in the plantain family Plantaginaceae. The species is native to Europe and a common weed in gardens, pastures, waste places, and cultivated land.

== Description ==
It is a hairy, erect to almost recumbent, annual herb, 9 to 40 centimetres (3.5 to 15.7 in) high from a taproot. The leaves are oppositely arranged in pairs about the stem. The lower leaves have short petioles; the upper are sessile. Each leaf, 1.5 to 2.5 centimetres (0.59 to 0.98 in) in length, is ovate, or triangular with a truncated or slightly cordate base, with coarse teeth. Borne in a raceme, initially compact but elongating with age, the flowers are pale blue to blue-violet, 2 to 3 mm in diameter, four-lobed with a narrow lowest lobe. Flower stalks are 0.5 to 2 millimetres (0.020 to 0.079 in) and shorter than the bracts. The fruit capsules are heart-shaped and shorter than the sepal-teeth. It flowers from April to October.

Similar species – V. arvensis has stem leaves incised rather than well-lobed; similar species include Veronica verna, which has well-lobed stem leaves but when they are few, the plant as a whole can resemble V. arvensis.

== Distribution ==
It is native to Africa, Asia and Europe.

== Growth ==
Veronica arvensis plants go through changes in their germination due to temperature and light that control the timing of growth in buried seed reserves. These plants tend to germinate in consistent temperature ranges of 10–15 °C (50–59 °F). If they do not make the first autumn cycle of growth, they can grow in the following spring.

== Uses ==
It is a medicinal plant.

Uses (Ethnobotany): The herb is alterative, antiscorbutic and diuretic. It has been used for the treatment of scurvy, impurities of the blood etc. It is also used as a remedy for scrofulous affections, especially of the skin, and is bruised and applied externally for healing burns and ulcers.
