= Henry Barton =

Member of the Parliament of England (d. 1435)

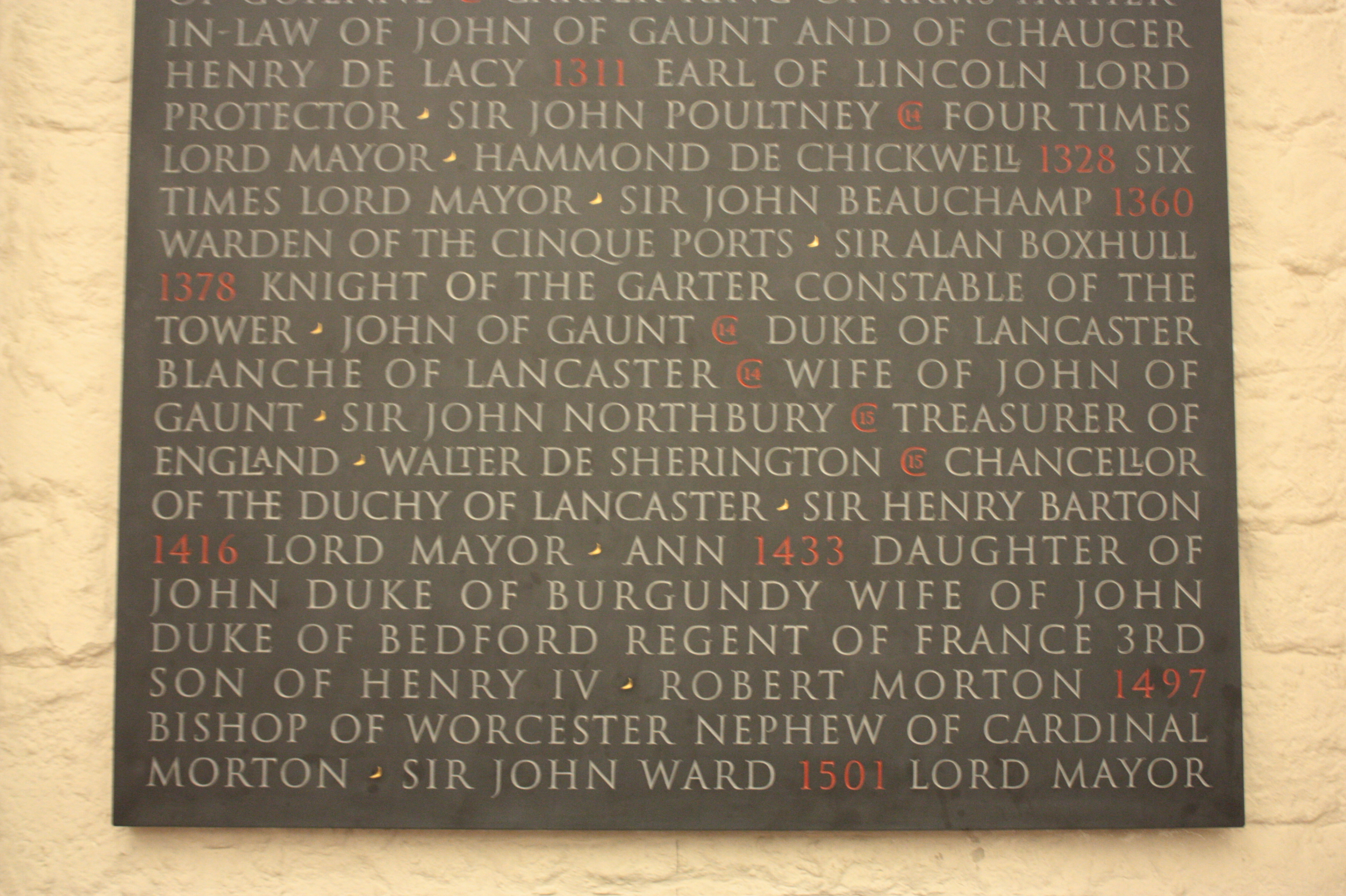
Barton's name listed on the Memorial to graves destroyed in Old St Paul's Cathedral

Sir Henry Barton (died 1435) was twice Lord Mayor of London in the 15th century.

== Life ==
He was born the son of Richard and Denise Barton and in 1400 was serving as Yeoman of the King's Chamber.

He was appointed Sheriff of London in 1406 and served as an Alderman for Farringdon ward and later Cornhill ward. He was elected Lord Mayor of London in 1416 and again in 1428. In 1419, he was Member of Parliament for the City of London as one of the two aldermanic representatives.

In 1407, he served as a tax collector.

He has a memorial on the wall of St Mary's Church, Mildenhall, but was buried in the Old St Paul's Cathedral. Consequently, his grave and monument were destroyed by the Great Fire of London in 1666, but he is listed on a modern memorial in the crypt giving the names of important graves lost (together with several other Lord Mayors).

== See also ==
- List of Sheriffs of the City of London
- List of Lord Mayors of London
- City of London (elections to the Parliament of England)
