= Go Ape =

Outdoor adventure company

Go Ape Ltd.
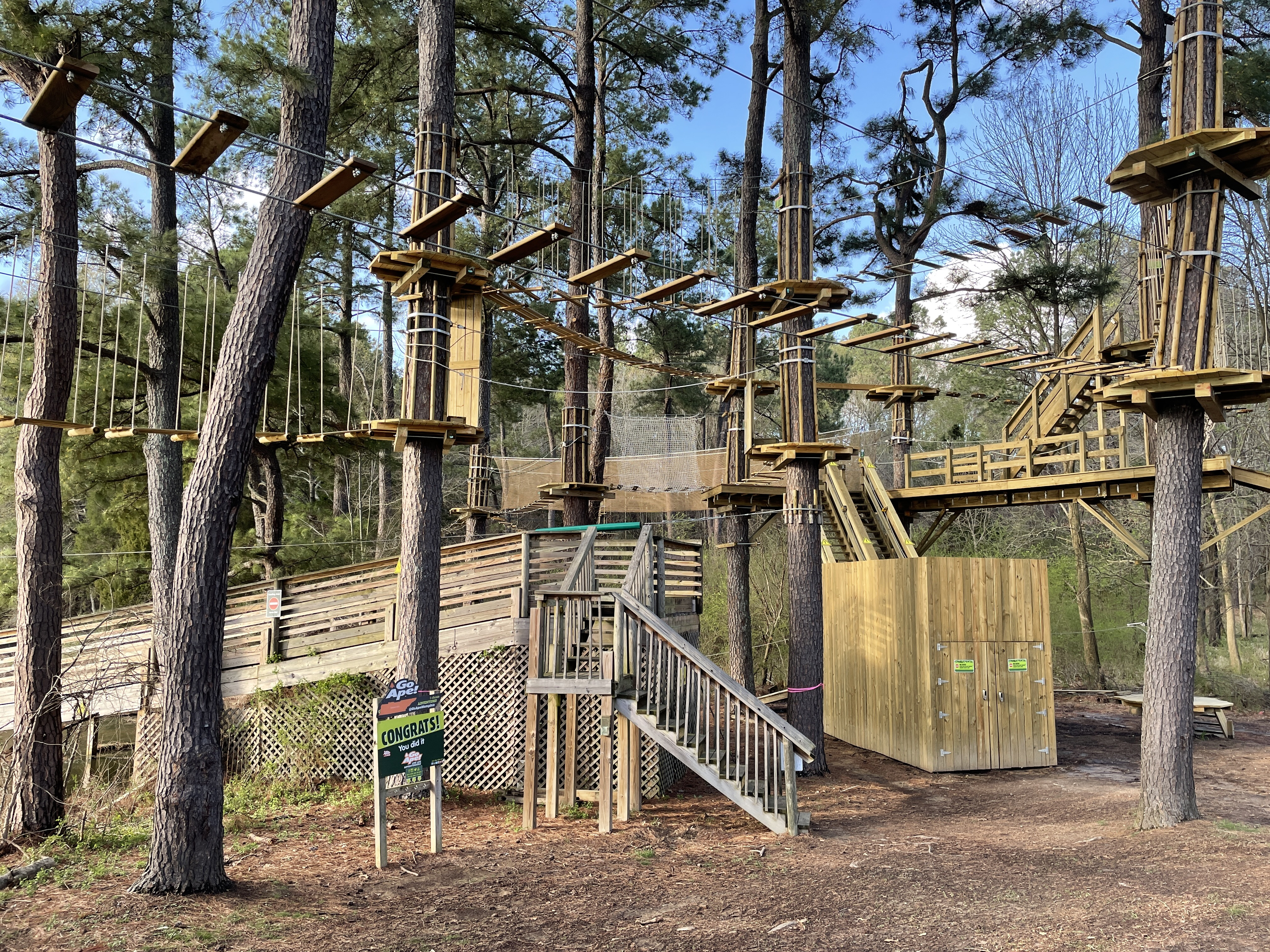
- Zipline at Shelby Farms
- Type: Employee owned
- Founded: 2002
- Founder: Rebecca Mayhew; Tristram Mayhew
- Headquarters: UK
- Services: Ropes courses, zip wires
- Website: goape.co.uk, goape.com

Go Ape! is an outdoor adventure company which runs tree top ropes courses under the names Tree Top Challenge, Tree Top Adventure and Zip Trekking, as well as ground-based Forest Segway Safaris, at locations across the United Kingdom and the United States.

== History ==
The company was founded in 2002 by Rebecca and Tristram Mayhew, after they were inspired by a tree-top adventure course in France, and has a contract with the Forestry Commission for courses on multiple sites. The first course opened in March 2002 in Thetford Forest, on the borders of Norfolk and Suffolk; it was the first self-belay tree top ropes course in Britain. In 2003, the company won a Best Tourist Attraction award and has also won other awards. In 2007, it was shortlisted for the Best Norfolk Attraction award at the Tourism In Norfolk Awards. In 2008 the company opened new courses in Kent, Cumbria, Devon, Buckinghamshire and Staffordshire. On 8 May 2010 Go Ape opened their first course in the United States at the Lake Needwood section of Rock Creek Regional Park in Rockville, Maryland. In March 2015, a "Treetop adventure course" was opened in Wake County.

The courses are made up of zip wires, rope swings, ladders, walkways, bridges and tunnels made of wood. There are "Adventure" courses at a number of sites around the country designed for 6–12 year olds. There are also Segway scooters and mountain bikes.

In 2014 Go Ape opened trampoline parks in East Kilbride, Wolverhampton and Stevenage under the name Air Space. This part of the business was sold in 2017 to Oxygen Freejumping. On 29 September 2019, Verity Bailes, from Peterborough, became the first person to complete Go Ape's Treetop Challenge at all 34 locations across the UK. In 2021 Go Ape became employee owned.

== Facilities ==
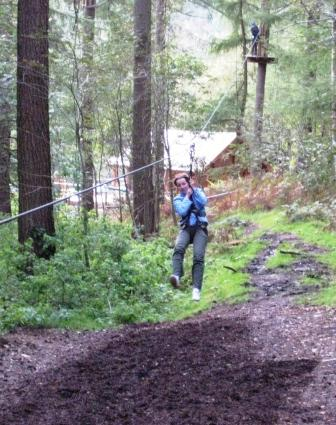
A woman on a Go Ape zip-line

There are 36 locations in parks, forests and woodlands in England, Scotland and Wales consisting of rope ladders, zip-lines, rope bridges, trapezes and swings. There are also 12 Forest Segway experiences, 25 Treetop Adventure, 16 Treetop Adventure Plus and 3 Nets Adventure courses. The course in Grizedale Forest, near The Lake District in Cumbria, has the longest dual zip-lines in Britain. As of 2022, four Go Ape locations offer an axe throwing experience.

== Public opposition ==
There have been public opposition to some of Go Ape's proposals. They withdrew their application to build a course in Glasgow's Pollok Park after 5000 objections from local residents. They chose not to build a course in the Bidjigal Reserve in New South Wales, and met some opposition to their plans to expand in Moel Famau, North Wales. In England, there was a public response over their proposal in Rivington and Essex County Council declined a proposal after protests. A Go Ape ropes course proposal in the United States was declined after a large neighbourhood outcry in Seattle's Lincoln Park.

== Safety ==
In 2008, a man aged 76 died after collapsing on a high wire platform at Go Ape's Aberfoyle, Scotland location. In a statement from the company, CEO Tristram Mayhew said that since 2002, 17 Go Ape courses had served over one million customers and "nothing like this has happened before".

In 2016, at a Go Ape location in Delaware, US, a woman fell 35 feet (11 m) and died. A statement from the company said that she had disconnected herself from the safety system while waiting to use a zip line, and that the company had safely served over six million customers.
