= All Saints' Church, Icklingham =

Coordinates: 52.3228°N 0.6042°E

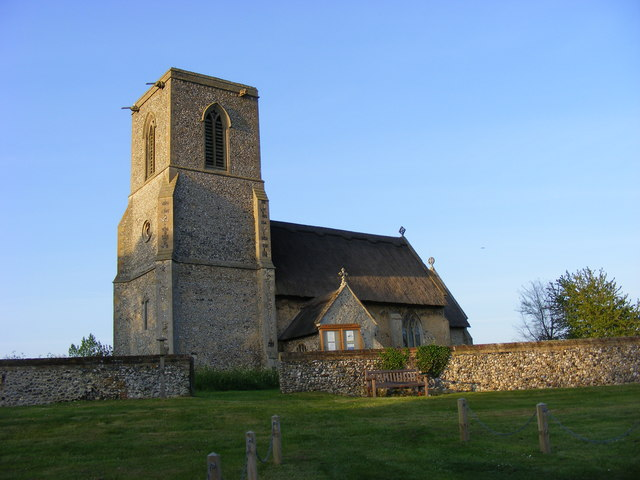
- All Saints' Church, Icklingham

- Location in Suffolk
- OS grid reference: TL 776 726
- Location: Icklingham, Suffolk
- Country: England
- Denomination: Anglican
- Website: Churches Conservation Trust

Architecture
- Functional status: Redundant
- Heritage designation: Grade I
- Designated: 7 May 1954
- Architectural type: Church
- Style: Norman, Gothic

Specifications
- Materials: Flint, thatched roof

All Saints' Church is a redundant Anglican church in the village of Icklingham, Suffolk, England. It is recorded in the National Heritage List for England as a designated Grade I listed building, and is under the care of the Churches Conservation Trust. The church stands in the highest point in the village, adjacent to the A1101 road between Mildenhall and Bury St Edmunds. This was formerly the ancient trackway of Icknield Way, and Icklingham is close to an important junction on this trackway.

== History ==
A Roman Christian graveyard exists in Icklingham, and a baptismal font was found on the same site. The Icklingham font is made of lead, and is visible in the British Museum.

Some of the fabric in the nave is Norman dating from the 11th or 12th century. The church was almost completely rebuilt in the 14th century, a time of great prosperity in the area. A south porch was added in the 15th century. The church has been unused for over 100 years, and its benefice has been united with that of St James, the other church in the village. It was declared redundant in the 1970s. Since passing into the care of the Churches Conservation Trust, its roof has been re-thatched in the traditional manner.

== Architecture ==
=== Exterior ===
The church is constructed in flint rubble with freestone dressings. The roof is thatched. Its plan consists of a four-bay nave with a south aisle and a south porch, a chancel, and a southwest tower. The tower is in three stages with a plain parapet and gargoyles, and has diagonal buttresses. In the lowest stage is a simple blocked doorway with a lancet window above it. In the middle stage is a circular window on the west side. The top stage contains large bell openings with Y-tracery on each side. The north nave wall contains the Norman fabric, which includes large areas of coursed flint walling and two blocked lancet windows. It also contains a doorway and 14th-century windows, and there are similar windows on the north and south walls of the chancel. The north wall of the chancel contains a doorway, and the east window has three lights. The east window of the south aisle has five lights, flanked by canopied niches. The niches show traces of colour, suggesting that they were originally painted. Its south wall contains a three-light window, and under the eaves is a cornice decorated with ball flowers. The porch has a pilastered doorway and two-light windows on each side. The south doorway into the church dates from the 14th century.

=== Interior ===
The south arcade has four bays carried on octagonal piers with moulded capitals. On the north and south walls is a cornice carved with a frieze containing a variety of motifs. There is a trefoil-headed piscina in the south wall of the aisle, and another in the south wall of the chancel. Also in the chancel is a double aumbry. The chancel also contains many 14th-century mosaic tiles with line-impressed decorations, dating from the 14th century. The rood screen is still partly present, and there is a door and stairs to the previous rood loft. The limestone font dates from the 14th century. It is carried on five columns, and its octagonal bowl is carved with different tracery on each face. The pulpit is also octagonal; it dates from the 17th century. Some of the stained glass dates from the 14th century. The pews are carved with poppyheads and date from between the 15th and the 17th centuries. There is a ring of three bells. Two of these were cast between 1424 and 1513 by Brasyers of Norwich, and the other in 1608 by John Draper of Thetford.

== See also ==
- List of churches preserved by the Churches Conservation Trust in the East of England
