= St Mary's Church, Mildenhall =

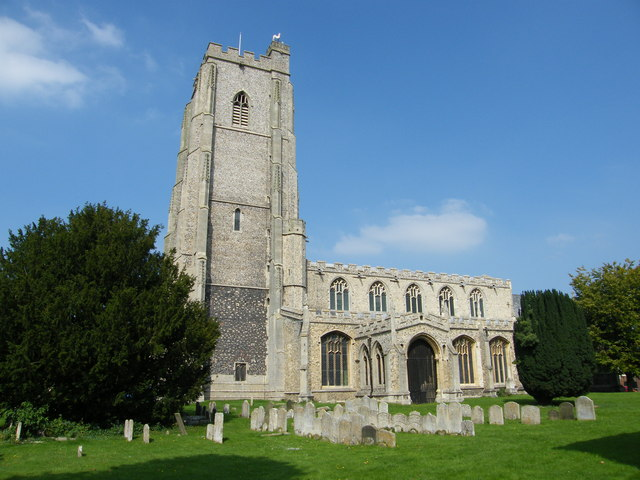
- St Mary's Church, Mildenhall
- St Mary's Church, Mildenhall
- 52°20′34.04″N 0°30′33.05″E
- OS grid reference: TL 71026 74598
- Location: Mildenhall, Suffolk
- Country: England
- Denomination: Church of England
- Website: mildenhallanglicanchurches.org

History
- Dedication: St Mary

Architecture
- Heritage designation: Grade I listed

Administration
- Diocese: Diocese of St Edmundsbury and Ipswich
- Archdeaconry: Suffolk
- Deanery: Sudbury
- Parish: Mildenhall

St Mary's Church is a Grade I listed parish church in the Church of England in Mildenhall, Suffolk.

== History ==
The church is mostly 14th century. Simon Jenkins awarded the church 4 stars in his 'England's Thousand Best Churches'.

== Memorials ==
- Sir Henry Barton, Lord Mayor of London 1416 and 1428. Cenotaph. South aisle.
- Sir Henry North (d.1620) alabaster tomb chest with effigies of him and his family. South aisle.
- Roger North, d.1651 and Thomasina North, d.1661. Wall tablets
- Sir Henry North (d.1671) . Wall tablet. Chancel arch.
- Sir Henry Warner (d.1617) and Edward Warner, and to Mary Warner (d.1601). Wall tablet. Chancel.
- William Coe (diarist) (d.1729). A floor slab in the vestry.
- Henry Bunbury (d.1722). Wall tablet. South aisle.
- Revd. John Hunt (d.1736). Wall tablet. Chancel.

== Parish status ==
The Parish of Mildenhall is part of the Mildenhall Team Ministry, along with the Parishes of:

- St Mary the Virgin's Church, Barton Mills
- St John's Church, Beck Row with Kenny Hill
- St Laurence & St Peter's Church, Eriswell
- St Andrew's Church, Freckenham
- St Ethelbert's Church, Herringswell
- St James's Church, Icklingham
- St Christopher's Church, Red Lodge
- St Mary & St Andrew's Church, Tuddenham with Cavenham
- St Andrew's Church, Cavenham
- St Peter's Church, West Row
- All Saints' Church, Worlington

== Bells ==
The church has a ring of 10 bells with the largest 8 bells cast at the Whitechapel Bell Foundry by Mears & Stainbank between 1887 and 1913. The ring was augmented to 10 with addition of 2 new trebles in 1946 cast by Gillett & Johnston in celebration of peace for the end of the World War II. The bells hang in steel & cast iron frame made by Mears & Stainbank and installed at the same time as the bells 4 to 9 were rehung in 1914. The tower is affiliated to the Suffolk Guild of Ringers.

Bells of St Mary's Mildenhall
Bell	Date	Note	Diameter	Founder	Weight		
Bell	Date	Note	Diameter	Founder	long measure	lb	kg
Treble	1946	G	25.75 in (65.4 cm)	Gillett & Johnston	4 long cwt 1 qr 21 lb	497	225
2nd	1946	F	26.50 in (67.3 cm)	Gillett & Johnston	4 long cwt 3 qr 6 lb	538	244
3rd	1887	Eb	28.50 in (72.4 cm)	Mears & Stainbank	5 long cwt 1 qr 21 lb	609	276
4th	1913	D	30.00 in (76.2 cm)	Mears & Stainbank	5 long cwt 1 qr 27 lb	615	279
5th	1913	C	31.75 in (80.6 cm)	Mears & Stainbank	5 long cwt 3 qr 2 lb	646	293
6th	1913	Bb	34.25 in (87.0 cm)	Mears & Stainbank	6 long cwt 3 qr 0 lb	756	343
7th	1913	Ab	37.50 in (95.3 cm)	Mears & Stainbank	8 long cwt 0 qr 20 lb	916	415
8th	1913	G	39.00 in (99.1 cm)	Mears & Stainbank	9 long cwt 0 qr 18 lb	1,026	465
9th	1913	F	42.50 in (108.0 cm)	Mears & Stainbank	12 long cwt 0 qr 7 lb	1,351	613
Tenor	1887	Eb	48.50 in (123.2 cm)	Mears & Stainbank	16 long cwt 3 qr 23 lb	1,899	861

== Organ ==
The church has a two manual pipe organ dating from 1865 by Father Henry Willis. A specification of the organ can be found on the National Pipe Organ Register.
