= Clubiona rosserae =

Scientific classification
- Kingdom: Animalia
- Phylum: Arthropoda
- Subphylum: Chelicerata
- Class: Arachnida
- Order: Araneae
- Infraorder: Araneomorphae
- Family: Clubionidae
- Genus: Clubiona
- Species: C. rosserae

Binomial name
- Clubiona rosserae Locket, 1953

Species of spider

Clubiona rosserae, or Rosser's sac spider, is a rare species of sac spider native to wetlands of Great Britain. Though once feared to be extinct, a colony was discovered in 2010 at Chippenham Fen in Cambridgeshire. It can also be found at the Cavenham-Icklingham Heaths Site of Special Scientific Interest (SSSI) in north Suffolk.
