= RWSfm 103.3 =

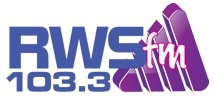
- Bury St Edmunds; England
- Frequency: 103.3 MHz
- RDS: RWSfm

Programming
- Format: Community radio

Ownership
- Owner: Radio West Suffolk Limited

History
- First air date: 13 August 2010

Links
- Website: www.rwsfm.co.uk

RWSfm 103.3 is a United Kingdom based radio station and is the community radio station serving the town of Bury St Edmunds, Suffolk, and the surrounding areas, offering music and local information. The station was awarded a community radio license by Ofcom in 2010 and began broadcasting on 13 August 2010.

== History ==
Launched in August 2010, RWSfm 103.3 started broadcasting to Bury St Edmunds and surrounding villages on 103.3fm from its studios just off Hardwick Lane, having previously broadcast via various other methods.

From the summer of 2015, the station launched its own local news bulletin, broadcasting local news stories at half past each hour seven days a week between 7:30 and 17:30. This followed a warning from Ofcom, who found the station in breach of failing to adhere to its key commitments and subsequently put the station on notice.

In December 2019, the station was awarded extra power to broadcast further into the community in West Suffolk. In August 2020, Ofcom then granted the station a second five-year extension to its license.

In January 2021, the station received a grant of £5,625 from the Bury St Edmunds Town Council to upgrade its transmitter due to its 'patchy' signal in certain areas of Bury St Edmunds.

On 20 September 2023, Managing Director and joint Station Manager, Julie Macleod, applied to Ofcom to change their "Key Commitments" to cater for the upgraded power increase.
