= Thetford Forest =

Forest in the United Kingdom

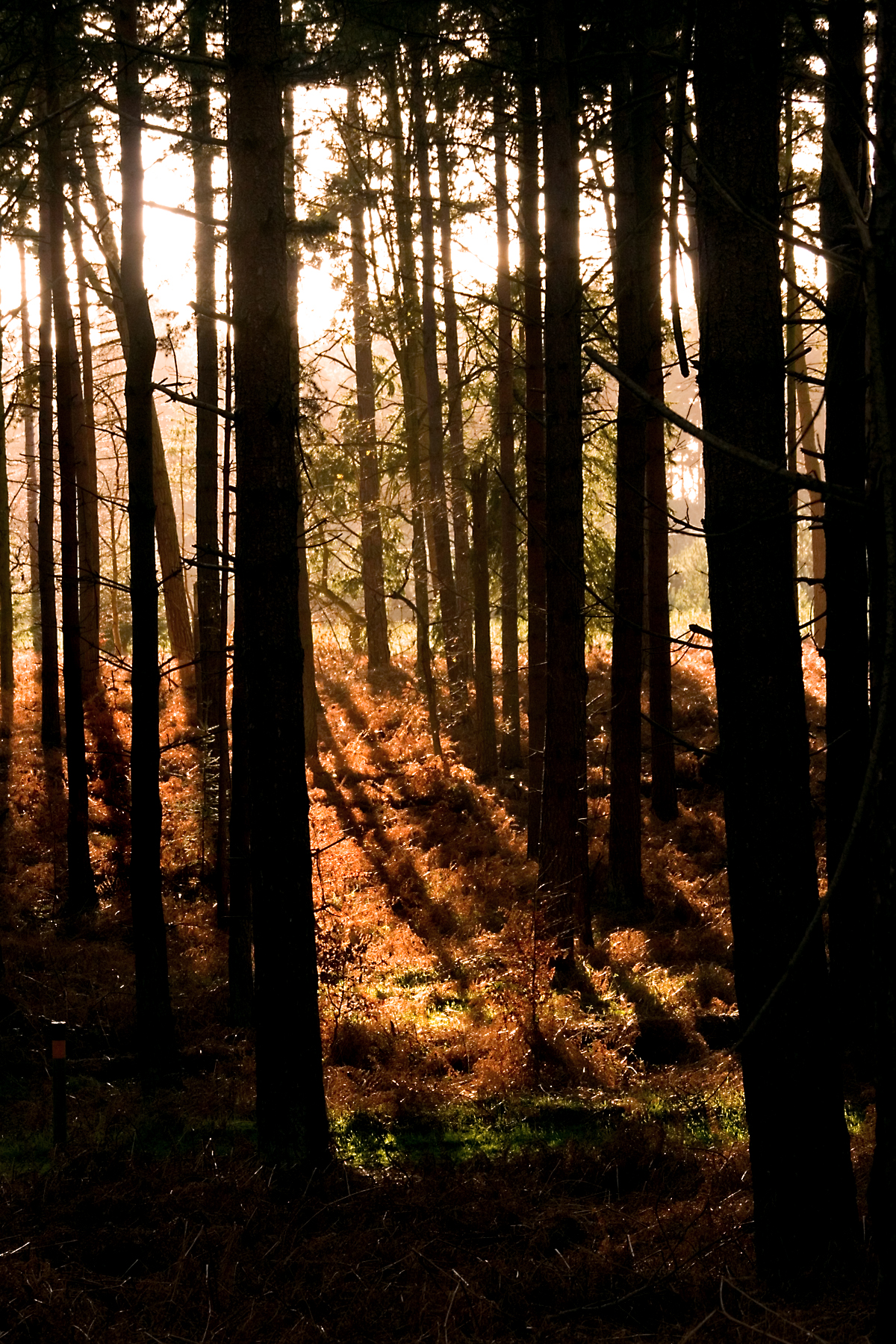
- A view of the forest
- Interactive map of Thetford Forest
- Type: Woodland
- Location: Norfolk and Suffolk
- Coordinates: 52.46028°N 0.64797°E
- Area: 19,000 ha (47,000 acres)
- Created: 1922
- Operator: Forestry England
- Visitors: 1 million+
- Open: All year
- Website: Forestry England

Thetford Forest is the largest lowland pine forest in Great Britain and is located in a region straddling the north of Suffolk and the south of Norfolk in England. It covers over 19,000 ha (47,000 acres) in the form of a Site of Special Scientific Interest.

== History ==
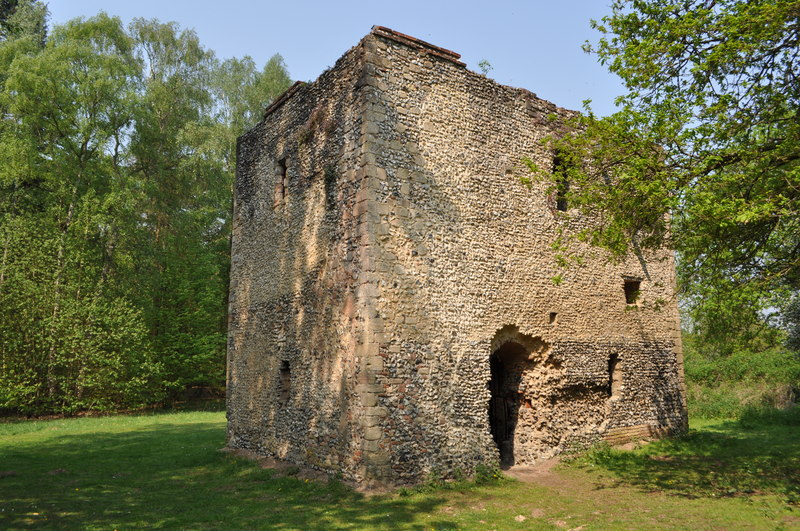
The Warren Lodge, built by the priory

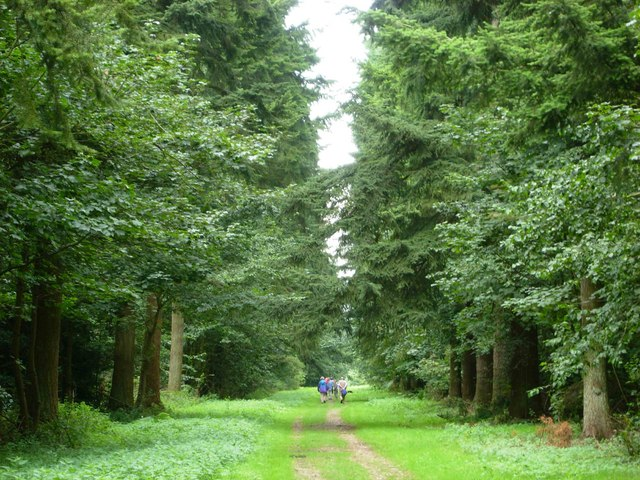
The Big Wood, Thetford.

Thetford Forest was created after the First World War to provide a strategic reserve of timber, since the country had lost so many oaks and other slow-growing trees as a consequence of the war's demands. It is managed by Forestry England. The creation of the forest destroyed much of the typical Breckland environment of gorse and sandy ridges, ending the frequent sand blows (where the wind picked up sand and blew it across the land reducing visibility). However, this environment was itself man-made, since the area had been denuded by flint-mining, the construction of rabbit warrens and other activities. Grime's Graves is located within the forest.

=== Making a landscape ===
==== Acquiring the land ====
By the end of the First World War the economic position of the large landed estates in England were bleak and particularly acute in areas of poor soil like Breckland. Farms were left untenanted and land became derelict. At this time Forestry England had been established. In 1922, the first purchases of land were made with over 80% of the land in Thetford Forest acquired in the 1920s and 1930s in the form of large blocks of land from the former estates.

==== Management ====
Since the forest's inception, decisions affecting the forest have been taken locally at the Divisional Offices at Santon Downham. At a local level, authority rested with the Divisional or District Officers. Many of these officers were recruited from affluent, land owning families who were attracted into forestry at the time when much of agriculture was in a depressed state. Foresters were the next level in the hierarchy and were often recruited from the forestry workers and by the 1940s they were trained for two years in the Commission's Forestry Schools. Beneath them were the gangers or foremen who supervised the forestry workers. The forest workers were organised into gangs of between three and thirty, their tasks included clearing ground, planting, weeding and later brashing and thinning.

==== Labour and labour camps ====
Breckland of the 1920s was an area of high unemployment and the Commission had few problems recruiting staff. From the outset the Commission believed that it would help alleviate unemployment in rural Britain. Many people were keen to take up forestry work, especially as the job included a tied cottage, many with an attached small holding. By the late 1920s, unemployed people, mainly miners, from the depressed areas of the North of England were housed in the forest holdings. As the depression deepened training camps were established. From 1928 up to 1938, 21 camps and a further 10 only used in the summer months housing a total of 6000 men were scattered throughout the infant forest. The unemployment schemes and mass unemployment came to an end with the onset of World War II.

The war years saw a drastic shortage of labour as local men joined the armed forces or took up other jobs. This led to a significant number of women employed in the forest. They were employed by the Timber Production Department, and by 1943 the Women's Land Army had a training camp at Wordwell on the edge of the forest. With the end of the war women workers gradually decreased. In 1946, the Forest Workers Training Scheme was set up providing one year's training for demobbed servicemen. During the post-war years the number of people employed increased to 570 by 1950. However, with the development of the nearby town of Thetford recruitment of labour became more difficult. With the introduction of modern technology and the use of modern weedkillers these problems eased through the sixties and by the mid-1970s the numbers of workers was similar to the 1930s.

=== Planting ===
==== Seed collection ====
The vast quantities of trees needed for the forest in its infancy needed huge amounts of seed much of it obtained locally. Men and women were sent out into the countryside, gathering cones from existing plantations and pine hedges. As the new plantations matured it was possible to obtain seed from the forest itself. From 1925 the seed was extracted from the cones at the Seed Extraction Unit at Santon Downham, this continued to be operated until 1964. Once the seed had germinated the seedlings were transplanted after one year's growth. This was later increased to two years. After being lined out in the nursery they were grown on for one to two years before they were planted in the forest.

==== Tree species ====
Planting began as soon as a property was acquired by the Commission, with most of the forest planted within the first 20 years. The Scots pine was the initial choice as the main forest tree given the adverse local conditions and seeds being readily available in the locality. However, the Corsican pine was being established at several locations from the early 1920s. Today (2013), the tree is the dominant species in the forest owing to its having greater resistance to fungal diseases and insect pests, more tolerance of the thin chalky soils and producing a higher volume of timber per acre. Many other species of conifer were planted including the Douglas fir and larch but these were less tolerant of local conditions than the pines. Substantial numbers of indigenous hardwood trees were planted in the 1920s and 1930s. Oak and beech plantings were vulnerable to spring frosts and deer proved a threat particularly to the beech saplings. Oak tended to fare better but they grew slowly compared to pines, and were considered uneconomic with numbers being planted steadily declining. However, hardwood trees have been planted to form narrow roadside belts acting as a fire control measure. Besides oak and beech a wide variety of species including lime, walnut, red oak and maple have been established.

=== The forest matures ===
==== Maintenance and industry ====
As the trees became established and were approximately 20 feet high all side shoots up to six feet were removed. This process called brashing ensured easy access, less risk of fire and the first six feet of the tree had a reduced knotty core. The next stage after brashing was pre-thinning this process was carried out after 15 to 16 years. It involved the removal of diseased trees. Larger trees known as wolves were also removed as they suppressed their smaller and straighter more valuable neighbours. Thinning began when the trees were 18 to 20 years old, coinciding with the start of World War 2. At this time there was much debate about how the work would be carried out. It was decided that racks or access ways 18 to 20 feet in width would be cut and then dividing the compartments into blocks covering 5 acres. Next, two rows of trees were removed to create a rack some 10 feet wide. The thinnings were graded and the straighter poles used as pit props in the coal industry. Other thinnings had a wide range of uses including fencing posts, pea poles in gardens and into netting stakes for the local rabbit warrens. Curved or irregular shaped cuttings was sold as firewood. In 1946, a central processing depot was established at Brandon to process poles into pit-props destined for the East Midlands coalfields. Large amounts of waste material was generated and this attracted a secondary industry of charcoal burning. As the forest matured the quantity of the thinnings increased with the disposal of them continued to be a problem. By 1950, demand from the National Coal Board for the timber decreased and the commission had to find new outlets, these included many of the smaller poles being cut up and converted into wallboard and some 60 tons of pine transported each week to a wood wool factory in Manchester. Large numbers of thinnings were taken to the Commission's own creosote plant at Santon Downham which was established in 1958 before closing in 1970. As the forest matured the size of the material being removed increased and clear felling of mature areas began with felled timber being sold directly to timber merchants. By the mid 1960s chainsaws had been introduced and by the early 1980s specially adapted tractors and trailers known as forwarders came into widespread operation. With the arrival of the harvester in 1991 full mechanization had reached the forest. Some 2500 trees were being extracted each day producing 180,000 cubic metres of timber annually by 1997. Much of this is sold to local saw mills and used in the building industry with the remainder producing fence posts, pallets and pit props.

==== Conservation ====
Visitor numbers have been increasing steadily from the 1950s as the forest matured and now exceed 1 million annually. Open areas created by felling have made the forest a more pleasant place for visitors to walk and picnic. These changes have now attracted a wider variety of wildlife including birds such as crossbills and nesting sparrowhawks which have increased interest from naturalists. The commissions changing attitude to the public was in part a response to the threat of privatisation in the 1980s. In 1985 the Thetford Forest Management Plan were recommending a wide range of measures including the importance of wildlife and the forest to be visually pleasing and culminated in May 1990 with forest designated as a Forest Park. The growing importance of recreation was reflected with the opening of the High Lodge visitor centre in 1992. Conservation in the management of the forest has greatly increased and by 1991 a Conservation Panel made up of experts in various relevant fields had been set up. Within the forest English Nature have designated 11 SSSIs which have been chosen as representative of the principal Breckland habitats.

== Biodiversity ==
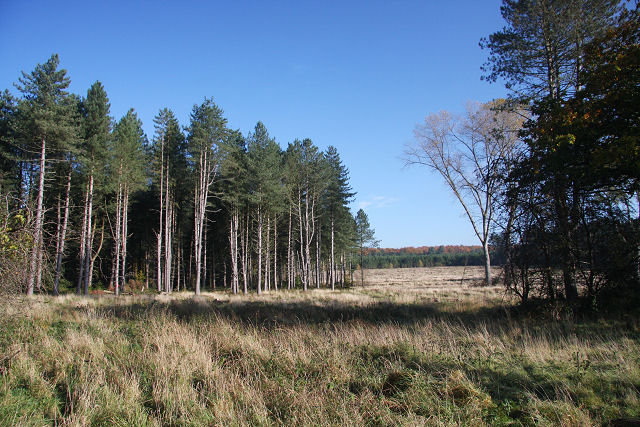
Southern fringe of Thetford Forest

The forest is largely surrounded by farmland, as well as the villages of West Stow, Ingham, Elveden, and the towns of Mundford and Thetford in Norfolk, and Brandon and Mildenhall in Suffolk. However, it has a high level of biodiversity. It is home to a large population of hares, rabbits and gamebirds. Several species of deer also reside there, muntjac, roe deer and a small population of red deer, the last hunted by the Norwich Staghounds before deer hunting was outlawed.

The forest is well known for its scarce breeding birds, such as woodlarks, nightjars, goshawks, crossbills, siskins as well as an introduced population of golden pheasants. All of these can be found at the Mayday recreation site. Stone curlews breed on the edges of the forest and there is often a wintering great grey shrike.

== High Lodge Visitors Centre ==
High Lodge Visitors Centre was opened in 1992 and has a cafe, cycle hire, adventure play areas, walking trails, outdoor concerts, theatre and entertainment. It is also the home to the Go Ape high wire adventure course.

== Mountain biking ==
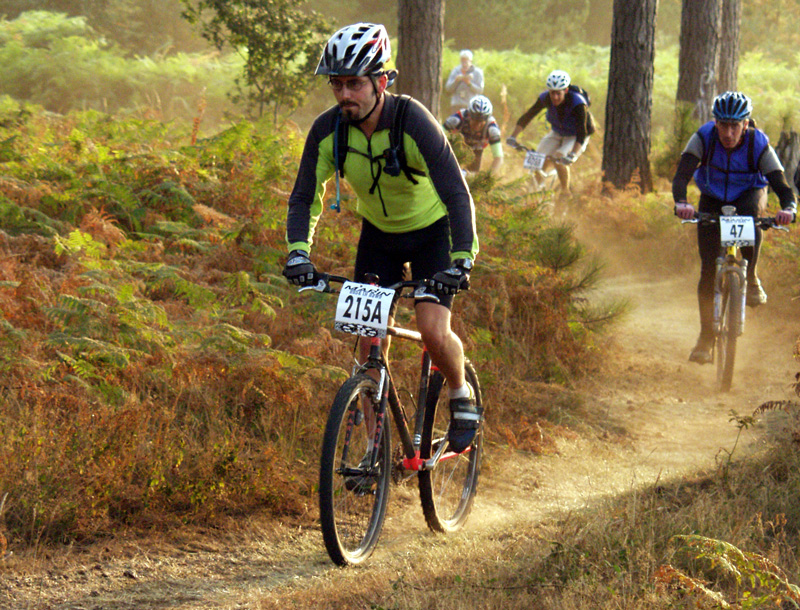
Mountain biking

The forest is a popular destination for mountain biking, and has several marked trails ranging from those suitable for families, to two red trails for experienced riders. The forest also has hundreds of miles of singletrack, several black-graded bomb holes and a steeply undulating section called "The Beast" at the end of the Lime Burner Trail.

National cross-country cycling races are held in the forest. There is also a recently formed organisation called TIMBER (Thetford Improved Mountain Biking EnviRonment) which aims to work with Forestry England to improve the mountain bike trails in the forest.

== In popular culture ==
Annual concerts from notable musicians including Pulp and Jools Holland are held in the forest at High Lodge. 2007 saw The Feeling, Blondie, M People, Travis, James Morrison and Van Morrison take to the stage. Keane and Westlife played at Thetford on one of their forest tour dates in the summer of 2010. Madness, Razorlight, Plan B, The Wanted, Will Young, Steps, Ed Sheeran all played concerts in the forest during summer 2012.

The forest was used as a location for the BBC series Dad's Army.

== Other activities ==
The Roman road known as Peddars Way leads from the north Norfolk coast and reaches its end in Thetford Forest, near Knettishall. Other walking routes in the Forest connect to it. There is also a walk way through the trees called 'Go Ape'. There is a Center Parcs holiday resort at Elveden which also brings many visitors. The British Siberian Husky Racing Association hold several husky racing events in the forest each winter.

== Military use ==
A sizeable proportion of Thetford Forest and the surrounding woodlands is reserved for military activities in an area known as Stanford Training Area, with public access forbidden.

== Public access ==
Four main roads bisect the forest at various points; A11, A134, A1064, A1065 and several minor roads. The forest towns of Brandon and Thetford are linked by the railway and the Little Ouse Path which approximately follows the course of the River Little Ouse.
