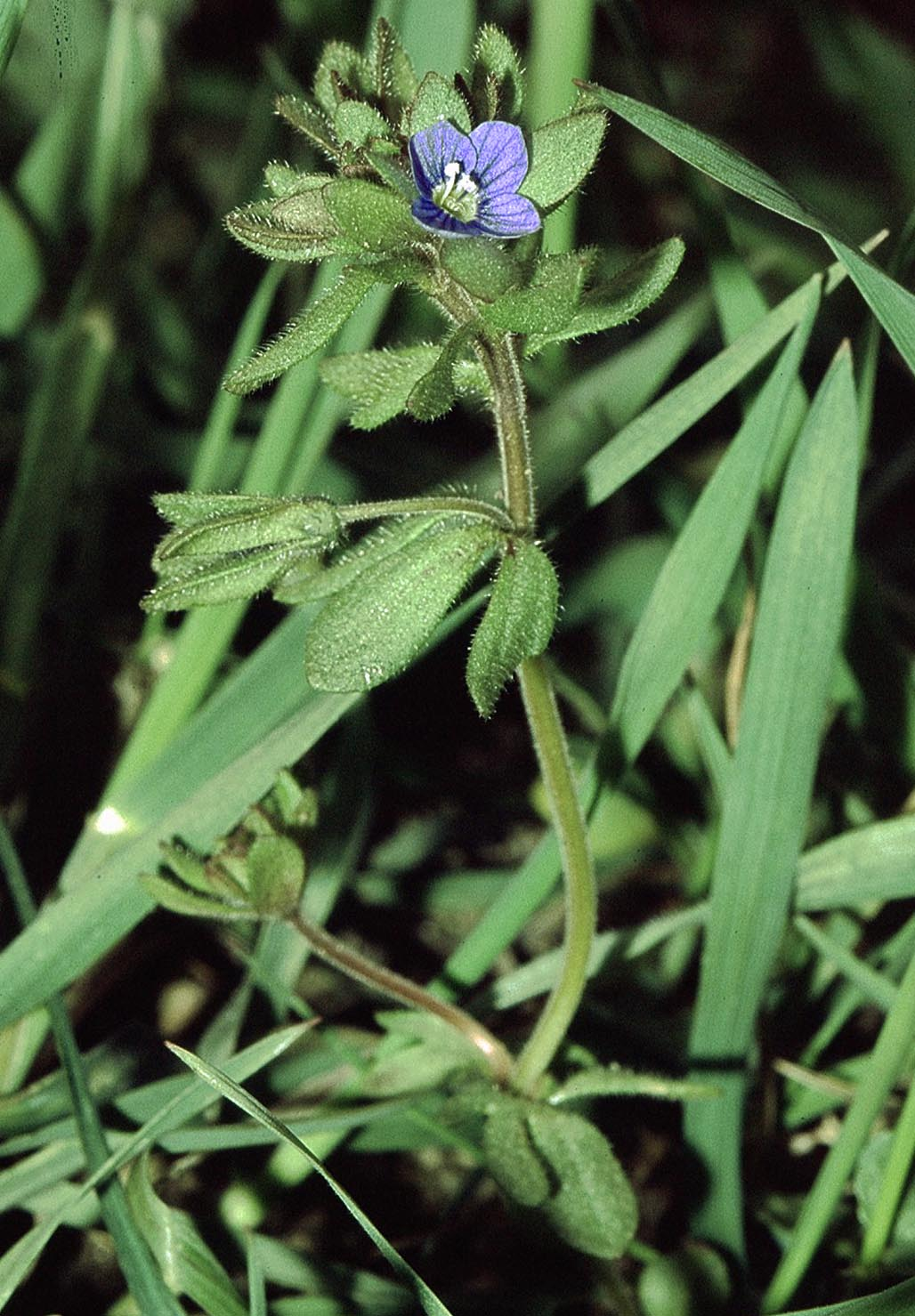

Scientific classification
- Kingdom: Plantae
- Clade: Tracheophytes
- Clade: Angiosperms
- Clade: Eudicots
- Clade: Asterids
- Order: Lamiales
- Family: Plantaginaceae
- Genus: Veronica
- Species: V. triphyllos

Binomial name
- Veronica triphyllos L.

= Veronica triphyllos =

Species of flowering plant

Veronica triphyllos is a species of flowering plant in the plantain family known by the common name finger speedwell, or fingered speedwell. It is native to Europe, western Asia and NW Africa, but introduced to some parts of the United States.

== Description ==
A small (to 20 cm) annual herb, glandular-hairy. Its paired leaves are small (to 12 x 8 mm) and deeply-lobed, the lobes tracing back to a small area of the leaf base like the fingers of a hand. The flowers at the stem tops are deep blue and small (3-4(10) mm diam) on moderately long stalks (5–15 mm), maturing to form a fruit of 5–6 mm. Its seeds are bowl-shaped.

Photographic examples can be seen on iNaturalist.

Similar plants include Veronica verna (having leaf lobes tracing back to the leaf length, short flower stalks (1–3 mm), and seed faces that are flat and convex).

== Distribution and habitat ==
Native to Europe, western Asia and introduced to the US - Native in Albania, Algeria, Austria, Baltic States, Belarus, Belgium, Bulgaria, Cyprus, Denmark, France, Germany, Greece, Hungary, Iran, Iraq, Italy, Kazakhstan, Crete, Crimea, Lebanon-Syria, Morocco, Netherlands, North Caucasus, Poland, Portugal, Romania, South European Russia, Spain, Sweden, Switzerland, Transcaucasus, Turkey, Ukraine, Uzbekistan, and Yugoslavia, doubtfully in Sicily, and introduced to California, Czechoslovakia, Great Britain, Idaho, Kansas, Missouri, New York, Oklahoma, Oregon and Washington.

Its habitat in Europe is dry grassland, cultivated ground and waste places.

Its habitat in Turkey is Pinus forests, stony pastures, rocky hills, banks, sandy fields, gardens and roadsides, 100–2,000 m (330–6,560 ft).
