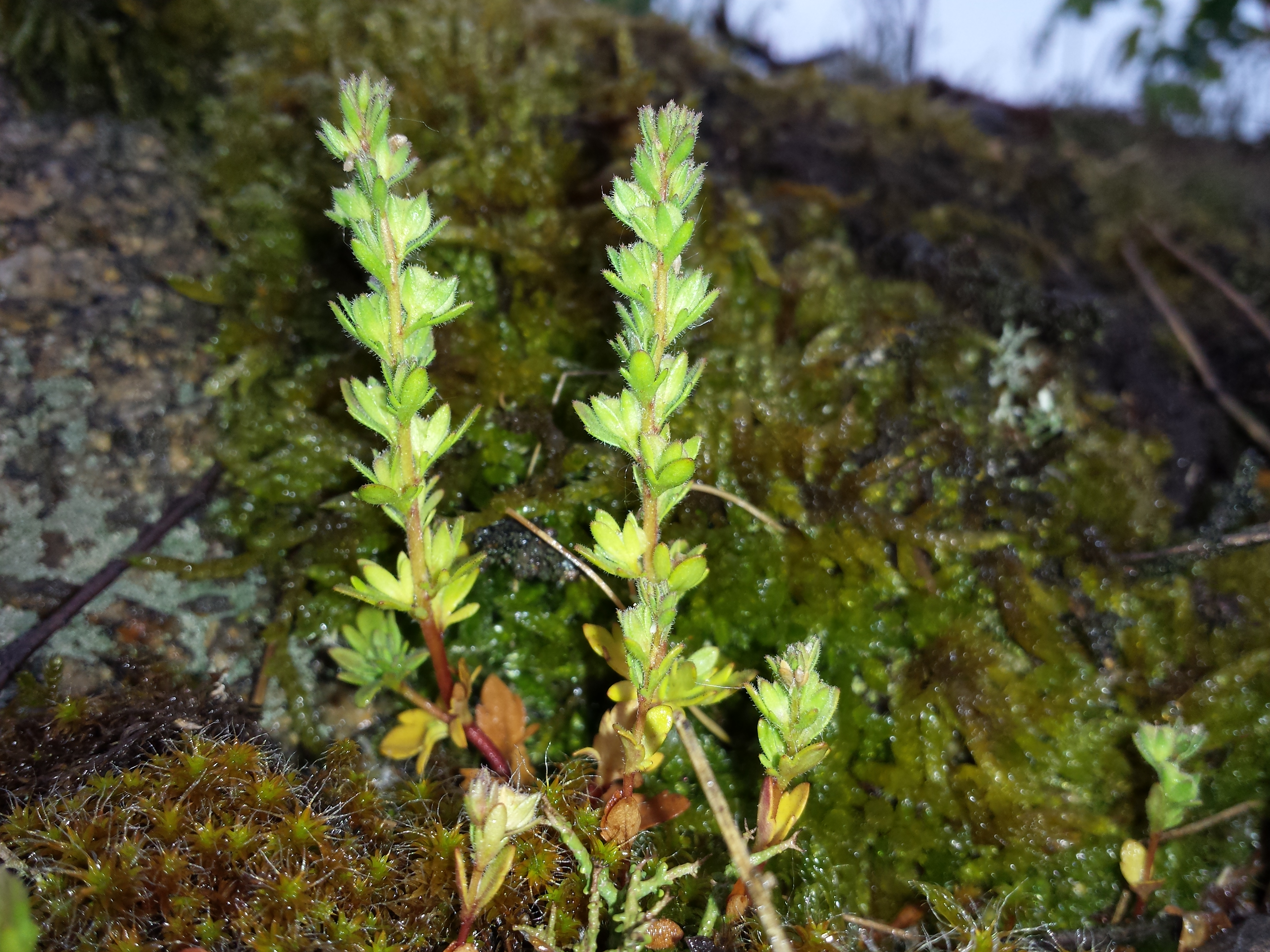

Scientific classification
- Kingdom: Plantae
- Clade: Tracheophytes
- Clade: Angiosperms
- Clade: Eudicots
- Clade: Asterids
- Order: Lamiales
- Family: Plantaginaceae
- Genus: Veronica
- Species: V. verna

Binomial name
- Veronica verna L.

= Veronica verna =

Species of flowering plant

Veronica verna is a species of flowering plant in the Plantaginaceae (Plantain) family known as spring speedwell. It is native to Europe, south-western Asia and Morocco, but introduced to some parts of the United States.

== Description ==
A small (5-15 cm), bright blue flowered annual speedwell, with small, deeply-lobed middle stem leaves (to 12 x 7 mm), the lobes tracing to the leaf axis, the lowest leaves are not deeply lobed, whilst the upper flower leaves are narrow and undivided (although being under a 5-part calyx they may look divided); on fruiting the inflorescence extends as it matures, with fruit capsules 3 x 4 mm on short stalks (1-3 mm), and short styles (0.5 mm). Sometimes the deeply-lobed leaves are not conspicuous and the whole appearance resembles Veronica arvensis unless examined closely.

Photographic examples can be seen on iNaturalist.

Similar plants include Veronica dillenii (with longer styles (1.5 mm), greater height (20 cm) and more robust, and larger seeds (1.25 x 1 mm vs. 1 x 0.75 mm)), Veronica arvensis (which lacks the deep leaf lobing, just having incisions) and Veronica triphyllos (whose leaf lobes trace to the base rather than the axis, and with longer fruiting stalks (4-15 mm)).

== Distribution and habitat ==
Native to Europe, south-western Asia and introduced to the US, a distribution slightly more northward than Veronica triphyllos - native to Afghanistan, Albania, Altay, Austria, Baltic States, Belarus, Belgium, Bulgaria, Central European Russia, Corsica, Czechoslovakia, Denmark, East European Russia, Finland, France, Germany, Great Britain, Greece, Hungary, Iran, Italy, Kazakhstan, Kyrgyzstan, Crimea, Morocco, Netherlands, North Caucasus, North European Russia, Northwest European Russia, Norway, Pakistan, Poland, Romania, Sardinia, Sicily, South European Russia, Spain, Sweden, Switzerland, Tajikistan, Transcaucasus, Turkey, Turkmenistan, Ukraine, Uzbekistan, West Himalaya, Xinjiang and Yugoslavia, and introduced to British Columbia, Idaho, Indiana, Massachusetts, Michigan, Minnesota, Montana, New Brunswick, New York, Newfoundland, Nova Scotia, Ontario, Oregon, Prince Edward Island, Washington, Wisconsin, and Wyoming.

Its habitat in Europe is cultivated fields and other dry places.

Its habitat in Turkey is open Pinus and Quercus forests, rocky and sandy steppe, pastures and meadows, a calcifuge (?), 1000-2100 m.
