= Breckland =

Natural region in Norfolk and Suffolk, UK

Coordinates: 52°30′N 0°46′E

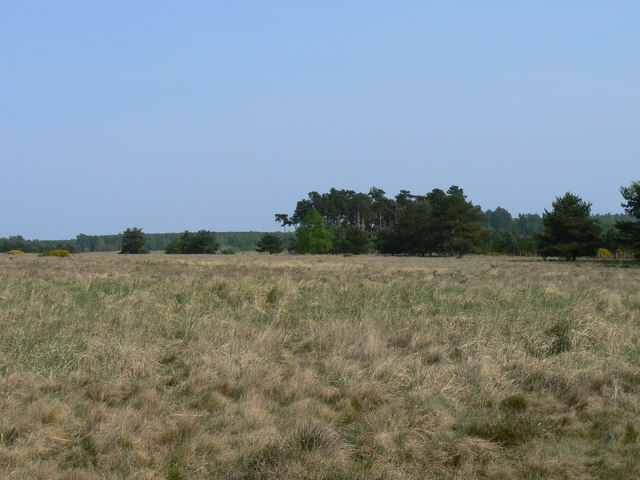
Breckland heath north-west of Thetford

Breckland in Norfolk and Suffolk is a 39,433 hectare Breckland Forest Special Protection Area (SPA) under the European Union Directive on the Conservation of Wild Birds. The SPA partly overlaps the 7,544 hectare Breckland Special Area of Conservation. As a landscape region it is an unusual natural habitat of England. It comprises the gorse-covered sandy heath that lies mostly in the south of the county of Norfolk but also in the north of Suffolk. An area of considerable interest for its unusual flora and fauna, it lies to the east of another unusual habitat, the Fens, and to the south west of the Broads. The typical tree of this area is the Scots pine. Breckland is one of the driest areas in England.

The area of Breckland has been substantially reduced in the twentieth century by the impact of modern farming and the creation in 1922 of Thetford Forest. However substantial areas have been preserved, not least by the presence of the British Army on the Stanford Battle Area.

During the Prehistoric period Breckland was mined for flint, evidence for which can be found at Grimes Graves just outside Thetford in Norfolk. The word 'Breck' is medieval and was defined as being an area of heathland broken up for cultivation before being allowed to retreat back into wilderness. Up until 200 years ago, much of it consisted of open heathland. The Brecks today are a tourist attraction as well as an area of scientific and geographical interest.

The Breckland landscape region has given its name to Breckland District, a local government district that contains most of Norfolk's portion of the Breckland. Part of West Suffolk district cover the Suffolk portion.

The Great Eastern Pingo Trail is 8 miles of tracks and paths exploring the eastern edge of the Breckland area. The trail takes in the commons at the villages of Thompson and Stow Bedon, and heathland at Breckles and Great Hockham. Thompson Water, an artificial lake, and the woodland at Thompson Carr also form part of the walk. The name of the trail comes from the former Great Eastern Railway and the large number of pingo ponds found in the area. Pingo ponds or kettle lakes are formed from collapsed mound of earth-covered ice, called pingos, formed when the ice-sheets retreated. The trail may be accessed as a detour from the Peddars Way long-distance footpath. It is a Local Nature Reserve.

== Wildlife ==
Although the Brecks has experienced extraordinary change and loss of wildlife species and habitats in the last 50 years, the varied habitats of the area continue to provide a refuge for many threatened species. 43% of the Brecks is protected at a national or international level for its wildlife or geological interest.

Over 12,845 species live in the Brecklands. This is one of the most important areas for wildlife in the UK, including birds such as the nightjars, woodlarks, and the 65% of the UK's stone curlew population. Sadly, 25 species previously recorded in breckland are now considered to be nationally extinct; ranging from flowers and mosses to beetles and moths.

The Brecklands are home to over 120 nationally rare and threatened plant species, many of which grow nowhere else in Britain. With all this diversity, Breckland has received international recognition as an Important Plant Area (IPA). Many of the flora and fauna that are unique to the area have a special protection status, or are part of conservation and rewilding projects.

Fauna that are being monitored in Breckland habitats include the woodlark, stone curlews, grey carpet moth, lunar yellow under-wing moth, nightjars, brush-thighed seed-eater beetle, forester moth, moonshiner beetle, and five-banded tailed digger wasp. Rare or endangered plants include the Spanish Catchfly, Spring Speedwell, Tower Mustard, Rare Spring-sedge, Red-tipped Cudweed, Field Wormwood, Prostrate Perennial Knawel, Fingered Speedwell, Military Orchid, Proliferous Pink, Bee Orchid Fine-leaved Sandwort, and Grape Hyacinth.

86% of Breckland heathland was lost between 1934 and 1980. Huge areas have been planted with conifer plantations and many heaths have been ploughed for arable crops. Grazing by sheep and cattle has declined and rabbit populations crashed when myxomatosis arrived in 1954. Combined with the loss of bracken and heather collection for animal bedding, large areas of heath have now become densely vegetated, crowding out the plants that preferred the open, disturbed and well-grazed land. In addition, much of the open sand dune habitat has also become overgrown, with sand no longer moving around in the wind .

A Pool Frog (Pelophylax lessonae) reintroduction project was started in 2005 by English Nature.

Breckland is one of the few areas in England where the rare and shy (but non-indigenous) golden pheasant may be seen in the wild.

== Gallery ==
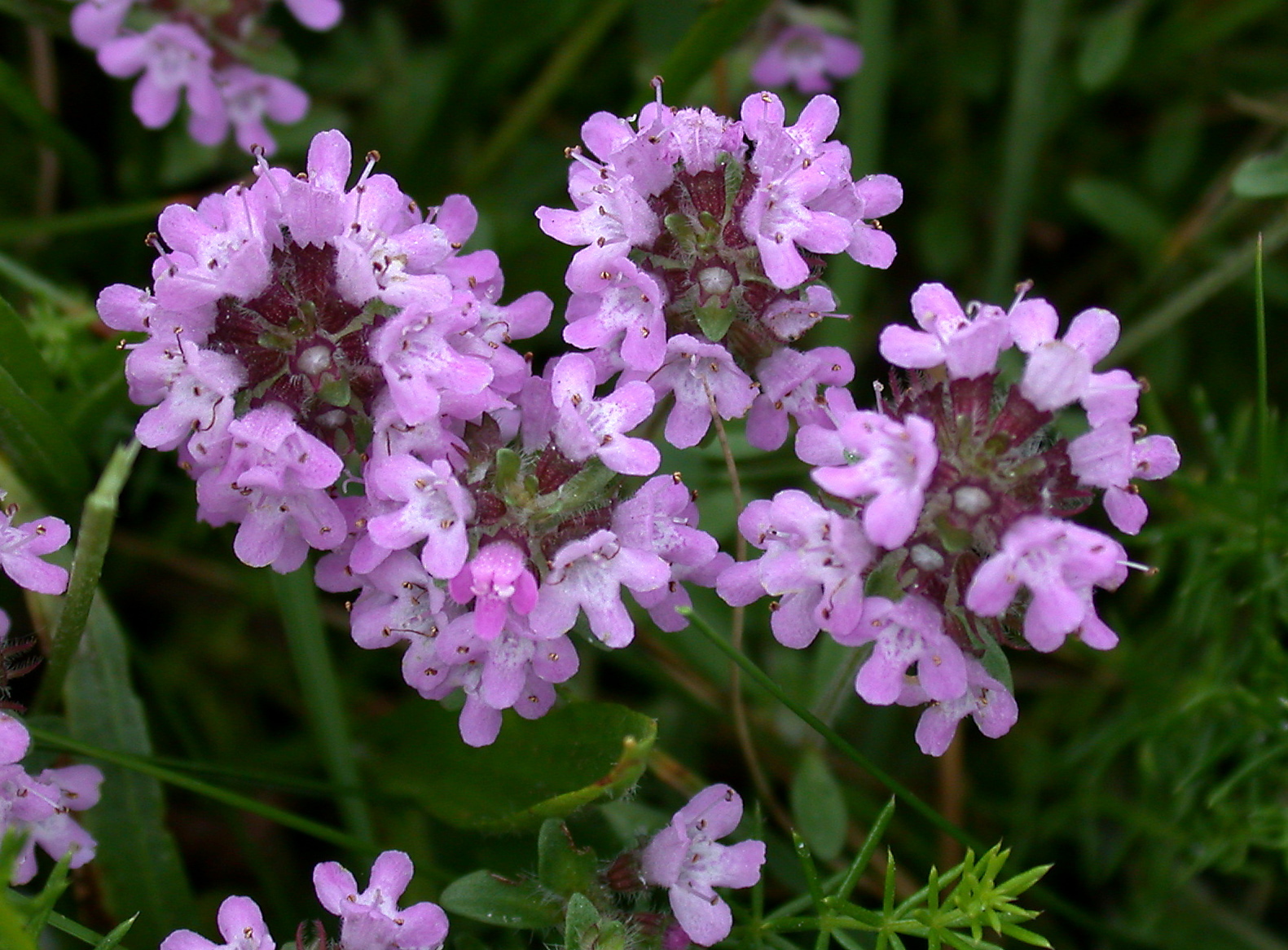
Breckland thyme (thymus serpyllum)

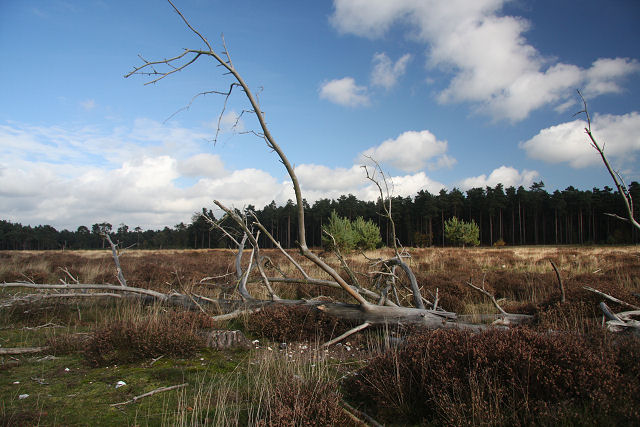
Brandon Park Heath

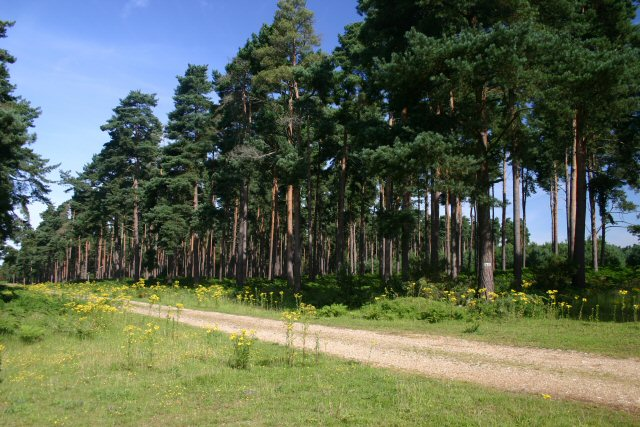
Scots pines in Thetford Forest

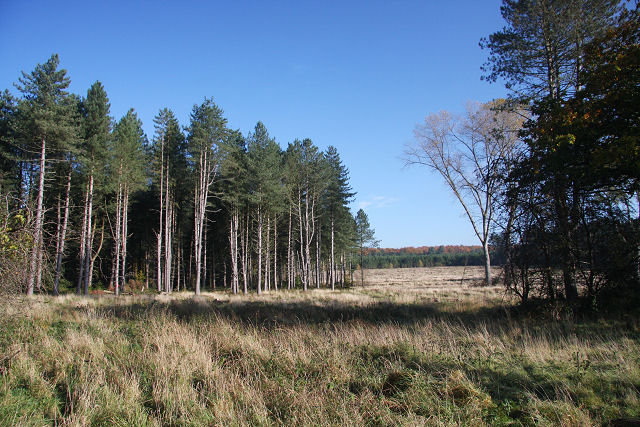
Open breckland meets dense forest

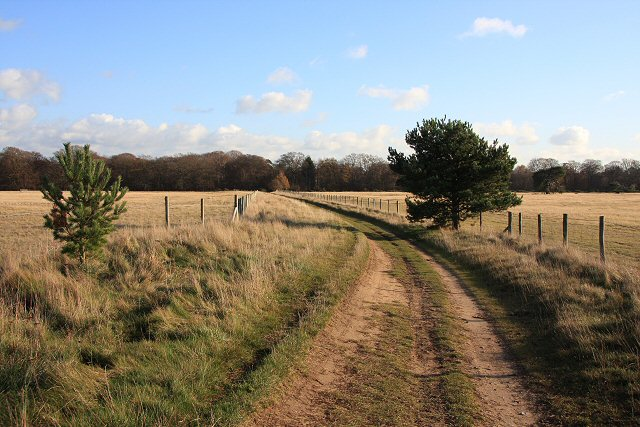
Breck heath at Weeting

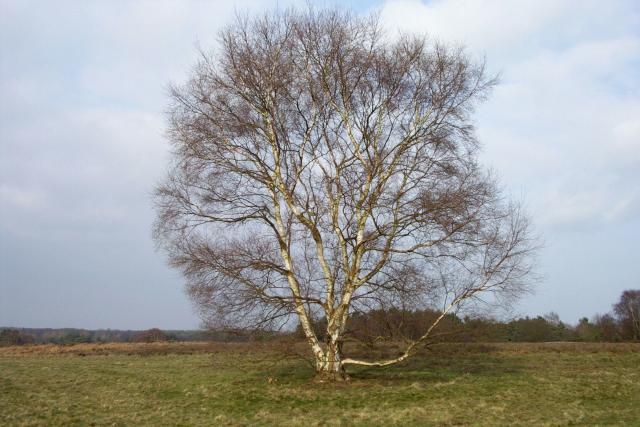
Knettishall Heath

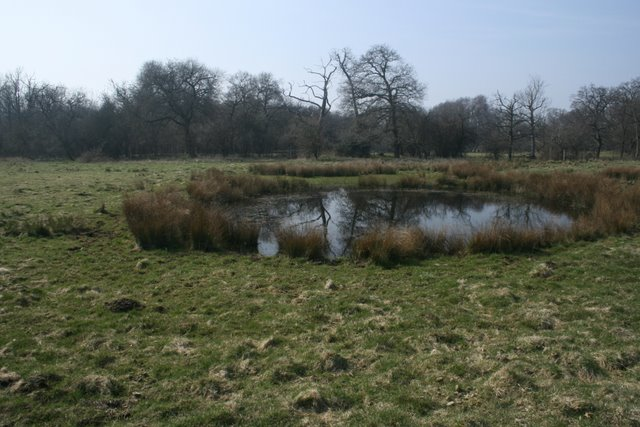
Pingo in open grassland

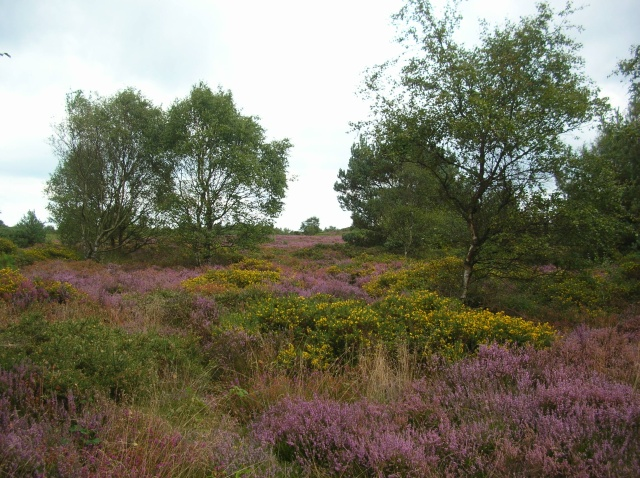
Typical breckland landscape

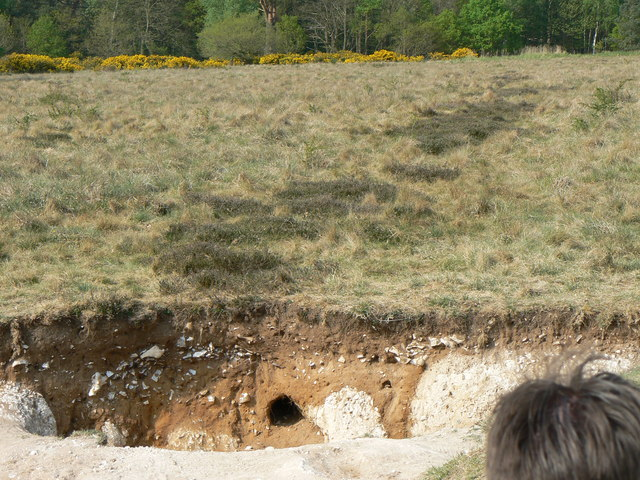
Breckland soil excavation

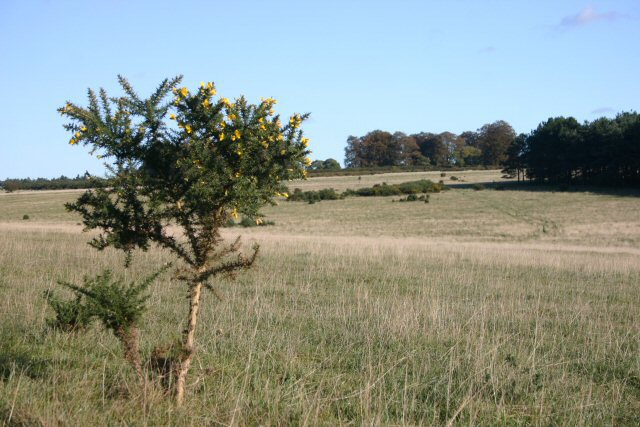
Gorse bush

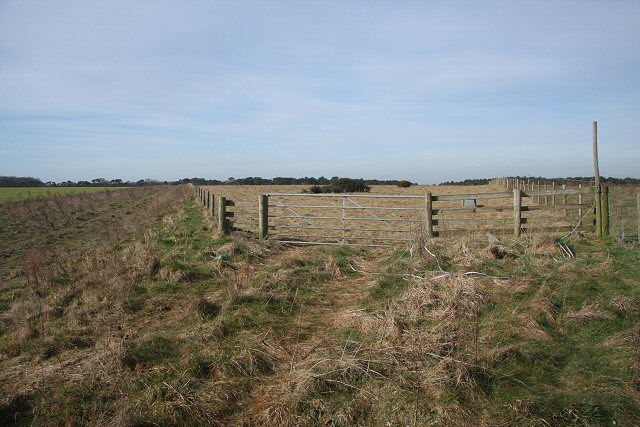
Gateway to the Brecks at Elveden

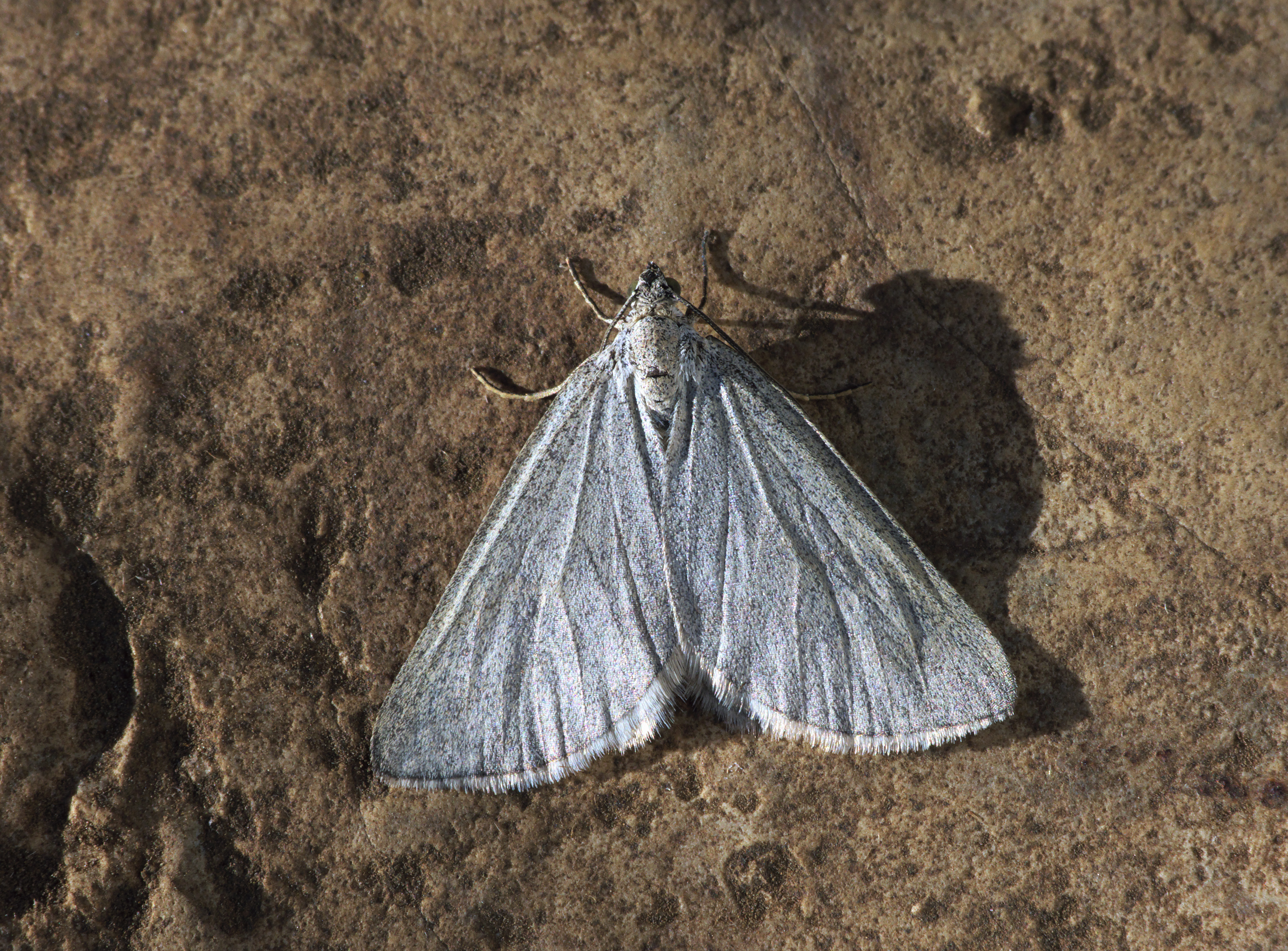
Grey Carpet moth
