= Jasmine Guinness =

Irish model, designer and Guinness heiress

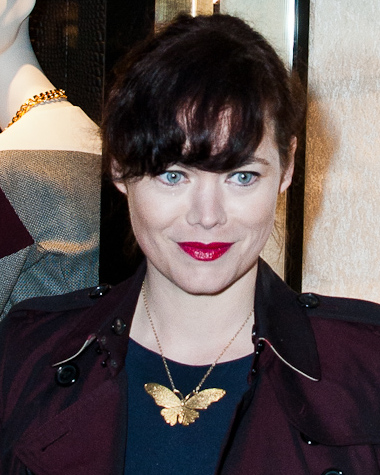
- Jasmine Guinness in a Fendi store opening in 2014
- Born: 28 September 1976 (age 49)
- Education: Winchester School of Art
- Occupations: Fashion designer, model
- Spouse: Gawain Raney (m. 2006)
- Children: 3
- Father: Patrick Guinness
- Relatives: Guinness family Desmond Guinness (grandfather); Mariga Guinness (grandmother)

Jasmine Leonora Guinness (born 28 September 1976) is an Irish designer and a fashion model active since 1994. She is a member of Anglo-Irish brewing Guinness family.

== Personal life ==
She is the daughter of Patrick Guinness and Liz Casey. She was educated at St. Columba's College, Rathfarnham, in Dublin. She also spent a year at Winchester School of Art.

She and Gawain O'Dare Rainey were engaged on 31 January 2005 and married on 1 July 2006 in Leixlip, Ireland. The wedding was extensively covered in Hello! magazine (in the issue dated 18 July 2006) and attended by 500 guests, including the designer of her draped silk dress, Jasper Conran, Mario Testino, Paddy Moloney, Anjelica Huston, Jacquetta Wheeler, Jade Parfitt, Erin O'Connor, Garech Browne and Philip Treacy.

Her husband is the son of Michael Rainey and the Hon. Jane Ormsby-Gore, a daughter of David, 5th Lord Harlech. They have two sons and a daughter together.

She opened the toy shop Honeyjam on London's Portobello Road in 2006

== Modelling career ==
A portrait of her is held at the National Portrait Gallery in London. She has modelled for various perfume and make-up campaigns, including Armani and Shu Uemura. She was the face of the "Goffs Million" horse races at the Curragh in September 2007, an event that paid the highest winnings of any race meeting in Europe.

In 2009 she was the face of the "Arthur's Day" event celebrating her ancestor Arthur Guinness. In March and December 2011 she was again the subject of articles in Hello.

2014 marked a revival of Guinness' modelling career as she led Jaeger's AW14 campaign alongside her mother Liz and fellow models Kirsty Hume and Jodie Kidd. Her range largely included knitwear; including cardigans, skirts and sweater dresses.

== Family ==
Guinness is the great-granddaughter of Diana Mitford (later Lady Mosley), who was one of the Mitford sisters, and her first husband Bryan Guinness, later the 2nd Lord Moyne. Her paternal grandfather, Desmond Guinness, was a conservationist specialising in Georgian and classical architecture, while her paternal grandmother, Mariga Guinness, was born Marie-Gabrielle, Princess of Urach. Desmond and Mariga Guinness were co-founders of the Irish Georgian Society. Guinness's maternal family was researched in the RTÉ programme Where Was Your Family During the Famine?

== Ancestors ==
Ancestors of Jasmine Guinness

Walter Guinness, 1st Baron Moyne
Bryan Guinness, 2nd Baron Moyne
Lady Evelyn Hilda Stuart Erskine
Desmond Guinness
David Freeman-Mitford, 2nd Baron Redesdale
Diana Mitford
Sydney Bowles
Patrick Guinness
Wilhelm Karl, 2nd Duke of Urach (King Mindaugas II of Lithuania)
Prince Albrecht von Urach, Count of Württemberg
Duchess Amalie in Bavaria
Princess Marie-Gabrielle "Mariga" von Urach
John Blackadder
Rosemary Blackadder
Anna Wilson
Jasmine Leonora Guinnness
Felicity Clare "Liz" Casey
