= Earl of Iveagh =

Earldom in the Peerage of the United Kingdom

Earldom of Iveagh
- Arms of the Earl of Iveagh Blazon Quarterly, 1st and 4th, Per saltire Gules and Azure a Lion rampant Or on a Chief Ermine a Dexter Hand couped at the wrist of the first, a Crescent for difference (for Guinness); 2nd and 3rd, Argent on a Fess between three Crescents Sable a Trefoil slipped Or (for Lee)
- Creation date: 30 September 1919
- Created by: King George V
- Peerage: United Kingdom
- First holder: Edward Guinness, 1st Viscount Iveagh
- Present holder: Edward Guinness, 4th Earl of Iveagh
- Heir apparent: Arthur Guinness, Viscount Elveden
- Remainder to: the 1st Earl's heirs male of the body lawfully begotten
- Subsidiary titles: Viscount Elveden
- Status: Extant
- Seat: Elveden Hall
- Motto: Spes mea in Deo ("My hope lies in God")

Earl of Iveagh (Note: (pronounced /ˈaɪvi/ EYE-vee—especially in Dublin—or /ˈaɪvɑː/ EYE-vah)) is a title in the Peerage of the United Kingdom, created in 1919 for the businessman and philanthropist Edward Guinness, 1st Viscount Iveagh. He was the third son of Sir Benjamin Guinness, 1st Baronet, of Ashford, and the great-grandson of Arthur Guinness, the founder of the Guinness brewery.

Guinness had already been created a baronet, of Castle Knock in the County of Dublin, in May 1885. He was subsequently made Baron Iveagh, of Iveagh in the County of Down, in January 1891, then Viscount Iveagh, of Iveagh in the County of Down, in December 1905, and was made Viscount Elveden, of Elveden in the County of Suffolk, at the same time that he was given the earldom in October 1919. All titles are in the Peerage of the United Kingdom.

As of 2015, the titles are held by his great-great-grandson, the fourth Earl, who succeeded his father in 1992.

The Conservative politician Walter Guinness, 1st Baron Moyne, was the third son of the first Earl, from whom stem the Baron Moyne branch.

The family seat is Elveden Hall, near Elveden, Suffolk, formerly residence of Duleep Singh, the last Maharaja of the Sikh Empire, purchased by the first earl in 1894.

== Earls of Iveagh (1919) ==
Created by George V
#	Name	Period	Spouse	Notes	Other titles
1	Edward Guinness (1847–1927)	1919–1927	Adelaide Guinness	Earl of Iveagh (1919); Viscount Iveagh (1905); Baron Iveagh (1891); Baronet of Castle Knock (1895)	
2	Rupert Guinness (1874–1967)	1927–1967	Lady Gwendolen Onslow	Son	Earl of Iveagh and Viscount Elveden (1919)
3	Benjamin Guinness (1937–1992)	1967–1992	Miranda Smiley	Grandson	Earl of Iveagh and Viscount Elveden (1919)
4	Edward Guinness (1969–)	1992–	Clare Hazell	Son	Earl of Iveagh and Viscount Elveden (1919)

The heir apparent is the current Earl's son, Arthur Guinness, Viscount Elveden.

== Title succession chart ==
Guinness family tree including: Guinness baronets, Barons Ardilaun, Barons Moyne, and Earls of Iveagh

Arthur Guinness; 1725–1803
Arthur Guinness II; 1768–1855
Guinness baronetcy of Ashford, 1867
Benjamin Lee Guinness; 1798–1868; 1st Baronet
Baron Ardilaun, 1880	Guinness baronetcy of Castleknock, 1885; Baron Iveagh, 1891; Viscount Iveagh, 1905; Earl of Iveagh and Viscount Elveden, 1919
Arthur Edward Guinness; 1840–1915; Baron Ardilaun, 2nd Baronet	Benjamin Lee Guinness II; 1842–1900	Edward Cecil Guinness; 1847–1927; 1st Earl of Iveagh, etc.
Barony Ardilaun extinct
Baron Moyne
Algernon Guinness; 1883–1954; 3rd Baronet	Kenelm Edward Lee Guinness; 1887–1937	Rupert Edward Cecil Lee Guinness; 1874–1967; 2nd Earl of Iveagh	Walter Edward Guinness; 1880–1944; 1st Baron Moyne
Kenelm Guinness; 1928–2011; 4th Baronet	Richard Guinness; 1906–1906	Arthur Guinness; 1912–1945 styled Viscount Elveden	Bryan Walter Guinness; 1905–1992; 2nd Baron Moyne
Kenelm Guinness b. 1962; 5th Baronet	Benjamin Guinness; 1937–1992; 3rd Earl of Iveagh	Jonathan Bryan Guinness; 1930–2026; 3rd Baron Moyne	Desmond Walter Guinness; 1931–2020
Kenelm Guinness b. 2005	Edward Guinness b. 1969; 4th Earl of Iveagh	Jasper Jonathan Richard Guinness; 1954–2011	Valentine Guy Bryan Guinness b. 1959; 4th Baron Moyne	Sebastian Walter Denis Guinness b. 1964	Patrick Desmond Carl Alexander Guinness b. 1956
Arthur Benjamin Geoffrey Guinness b. 2002 styled Viscount Elveden	Tom Guinness b. 1991

== Line of succession ==
Line of succession (simplified)
- Edward Guinness, 1st Earl of Iveagh (1847–1927)
  - Rupert Guinness, 2nd Earl of Iveagh (1874–1967)
    - Benjamin Guinness, 3rd Earl of Iveagh (1937–1992)
      - Edward Guinness, 4th Earl of Iveagh (born 1969)
        - (1). Arthur Benjamin Jeffrey Guinness, Viscount Elveden (born 2003)
        - (2). Hon. Rupert Bertram Ralph Guinness (born 2005)
      - (3). Hon. Rory Michael Benjamin Guinness (born 1974)
        - (4). Aidan Tidu Benjamin Guinness (born 2013)
  - Walter Guinness, 1st Baron Moyne (1880–1944)
    - Barons Moyne

== Arms ==
Coat of arms of Earl of Iveagh
Coronet A Coronet of an Earl Crest 1st: A Boar passant quarterly Or and Gules; 2nd: On a Pillar Argent encircled by a Ducal Coronet Or an Eagle preying on a Bird's Leg erased proper Escutcheon Quarterly: 1st and 4th, Per saltire Gules and Azure a Lion rampant Or on a Chief Ermine a Dexter Hand couped at the wrist of the first, a crescent added for difference (for Guinness); 2nd and 3rd, Argent on a Fess between three Crescents Sable a Trefoil slipped Or (for Lee) Supporters On either side a Stag Gules collared gemel and attired Or each resting a hind hoof upon an Escutcheon Vert charged with a Lion rampant Or Motto Spes mea in Deo ("My hope lies in God") Previous versions

== See also ==
- Guinness baronets, of Ashford
- Baron Moyne
- Guinness family
- McCartan Chiefs of Kinelarty

== Notes ==
Baronetage of the United Kingdom
Preceded by Samuelson baronets	Guinness baronets of Castleknock; 27 May 1885	Succeeded by Martin baronets
