= Mariga Guinness =

Architectural conservationist and socialite

- Born: Hermione Maria-Gabrielle von Urach; 21 September 1932; London
- Died: 8 May 1989 (aged 56); Irish Sea
- Spouse: Desmond Guinness
- Children: Patrick and Marina Guinness

Mariga Guinness (born Hermione Maria-Gabrielle von Urach; 21 September 1932 – 8 May 1989) was an architectural conservationist and socialite, and co-founder of the Irish Georgian Society.

== Life ==
=== Early life and family ===
Mariga Guinness was born Hermione Maria-Gabrielle von Urach in London on 21 September 1932. She was the only child of the marriage of Prince Albrecht von Urach, from Lichtenstein Castle, a member of the House of Urach, a morganatic branch of the royal House of Württemberg, and his first wife, Rosemary Blackadder (1901–1975) from Berwickshire in Scotland, a journalist and artist, who were married in Oslo in 1931. She was a princess from birth. For the first few months of her life she was very ill.

In 1934, her parents, both working as journalists, moved the family to Venice. They later moved again, to Japan. Her mother developed depression, and in 1937 tried to gain uninvited access to Emperor Hirohito's palace with her daughter. This resulted in her mother being arrested, sedated, and deported, which was the beginning of a decline in her mental health which culminated in a lobotomy in 1941 and spending the rest of her life in private mental institutions. Urach was returned to Europe, where she was brought up by her godmother, Hermione Ramsden, in Surrey and Norway, and educated by as many as seventeen governesses, with brief spells in boarding schools. Until the age of eighteen she was known as Gabrielle.

Urach met Desmond Guinness in 1951, when she was nineteen, and they were married in Oxford in 1954. Upon marriage, she became a member of the prominent Guinness family. They had two children, Patrick (born 1956) and Marina (born 1957).

=== Life in Ireland ===
The couple moved to Ireland in 1955 where they rented Carton House, County Kildare. They shared a love of Georgian architecture which resulted in them buying Leixlip Castle in 1958, and establishing the Irish Georgian Society on 21 February the same year. Through the society they campaigned for the restoration and protection of architectural sites such as Mountjoy Square, the gateway to the Dromana estate in County Waterford, the Tailors' Hall in Dublin, and Conolly's Folly in County Kildare. In 1967 they bought Castletown House, also in County Kildare, with a plan to restore it, and make it a base for the Irish Georgian Society.

During the 1960s Leixlip Castle was a hub for those interested in architecture and conservation, and the Guinnesses worked hands-on on a range of projects. By 1969, their marriage was in difficulties and Mariga moved to London. She later moved to Glenarm, County Antrim to live with Hugh O'Neill, and when that relationship ended, she returned to Leixlip Castle, but a divorce was finalised in 1981. Having lived in Dublin for a time, she rented Tullynisk House, the dower house of Birr Castle in County Offaly in 1983. Guinness became isolated and developed a problem with alcohol. While returning to Ireland from Wales on a car ferry on 8 May 1989 she had a massive heart attack which was compounded by a reaction to an injection of penicillin. She was buried at Conolly's Folly near Castletown.

== Descendants ==
Mariga and Desmond had two children, Marina and Patrick. Marina is a patron of the arts and of Irish musicians including Glen Hansard, Damien Rice, and the band Kíla. Marina has three children of her own: Patrick (by Stewart Copeland of The Police), Violet (by photographer Perry Ogden), and Finbar (by record producer Denny Cordell). Through Patrick, Mariga became grandmother of the fashion model Jasmine Guinness.

== Popular culture ==
In 2020, a new film on Guinness's life and work, entitled Memory of Mariga, received its US premiere as part of the Elizabethtown Film Festival on Saturday 19 September, at the Crowne Pointe Theatre in Elizabethtown, Kentucky. In 2021, the same film received its Irish premiere at the Fastnet Film Festival.
