= Guinness family =

Prominent Irish & British family in brewing, banking, and politics

- Arms granted posthumously to Richard Guinness and his descendants in 1814
- Current region: Ireland; United Kingdom
- Founder: Arthur Guinness
- Current head: Edward Guinness, 4th Earl of Iveagh
- Titles: Earl of Iveagh; Viscount Elveden; Baron Moyne; Baron Ardilaun; Guinness baronets
- Connected families: House of Hohenzollern; House of Urach; House of Fürstenberg; Rothschild family Mitford family Duke of Rutland; Marquess of Normanby; Earl of Buchan; Earl of Wemyss; Earl of Onslow; Baron Plunket; Baron Oranmore and Browne; Baron Churston
- Motto: Spes Mea In Deo ("My hope is in God")
- Estates: Elveden Hall, Suffolk; Biddesden House, Wiltshire; Wilbury House, Wiltshire; Farmleigh, County Dublin; Iveagh House, Dublin; Ashford Castle, County Mayo; Leixlip Castle, County Kildare; Glenmaroon & Knockmaroon House, Dublin; Luttrellstown Castle, Dublin; Luggala Lodge, County Wicklow

The Guinness family is an Anglo-Irish noble family known for its achievements in brewing, banking, politics, and Protestant ministry. The brewing branch is particularly well known among the general public for producing the dry stout beer Guinness, as founded by Arthur Guinness in 1759. An Anglo-Irish Protestant family, beginning in the late 18th century, they became a part of what is known in Ireland as the Protestant Ascendancy.

The "banking line" Guinnesses all descend from Arthur's brother Samuel (1727–1795) who set up as a goldbeater in Dublin in 1750; his son Richard (1755–1830), a Dublin barrister; and Richard's son Robert Rundell Guinness who founded Guinness Mahon in 1836.

The current head of the family is the Earl of Iveagh. Another prominent branch, descended from the 1st Earl of Iveagh, is headed by Lord Moyne.

== Origins ==
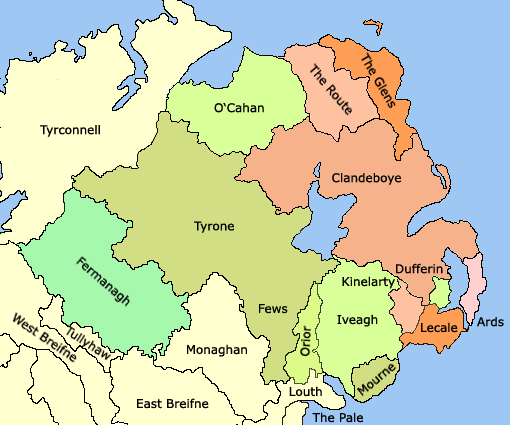
Ulster in the early 16th century. The territory of Iveagh was ruled by the Magennis clan

The Guinness family refers to the descendants of Richard Guinness (born c. 1690) of Celbridge, who married Elizabeth Read (1698–1742), the daughter of a farmer from Oughterard, County Kildare. Details of Richard's life and family background are scarce, with many legends and rumours, and as a result tracing ancestry beyond him has proven difficult. On the subject Lord Moyne, writing in The Times in 1959, wrote:

The origins of our family are hidden in the mists of a not very remote antiquity. The first Guinness of whom there is an undoubted record is Richard Guinness of Celbridge, county Kildare, who was born about 1690 and was living in Leixlip in 1766. Efforts to trace the origin of the family beyond him have met with no success; conjecture, supported by inconclusive pieces of evidence, have led principally in the direction of the Magennis family of county Down and of the Gennys family of Cornwall.

Arms of Magennis of Iveagh, which formed the basis of the Guinness armorial bearings

The traditional view is that the Guinnesses were descended from the Clan Magennis of Iveagh, prominent Irish-Gaelic nobility from County Down. The Magennis family were Jacobites who, led by Bryan Magennis, 5th Viscount Iveagh, fought at the Battle of the Boyne in 1690. Members of the arriviste Guinness family, wishing for more impressive origins, have long claimed Magennis ancestry. Sir Bernard Burke corroborated this descent in his various genealogical works. The Rev. Hosea Guinness was granted an altered version of their coat of arms; and Edward Cecil Guinness, head of the brewing line, chose for his title "Earl of Iveagh" (alluding to descent from the Viscounts Iveagh of the 1623 creation). A romantic and fanciful rumour existed that Richard Guinness was the illegitimate son of Viscount Magennis before he fled to the Continent.

However, in 2007 Patrick Guinness authored Arthur's Round: The Life and Times of Brewing Legend Arthur Guinness in which he largely disproves the apparent pretence of descent from Magennis of Iveagh. Instead, based on DNA testing conducted by Trinity College Dublin, Patrick Guinness asserts descent from the Macartans, a lesser County Down clan under the Magennises. He further demonstrates that the ancestors of the Guinness family were not descended from the Macartan chiefs but in fact mere followers and tenants. According to him, the name derives from the townland of Guiness (Irish: Gion Ais) which in 1640 is recorded as property of Phelim Macartan.

Parallel and contrasting the Magennis theory, one rumour was that Richard Guinness was the illegitimate son of an English (i.e. Williamite) soldier stranded in Ireland after the Boyne, and an Irish girl. According to the same sort of rumours, Richard was a groom who eloped with Elizabeth Read. Henry Seymour Guinness, of the banking line, who was the first to suggest "Owen Guinnis" as the father of Richard, was the main proponent of English origins – in Cornwall specifically. Patrick Guinness dismisses this on the basis that Henry Guinness's great-uncle was an MP for Barnstaple and bankrupted, and therefore biased and unreliable. He does however concur with the theory that Owen Guinnis was the father of Richard.

== Prominent members ==
- Richard Guinness (c.1690–c.1766)
  - Arthur Guinness (1725–1803); founder of the Guinness brewery in 1759; married Olivia Whitmore
    - The Rev. Hosea Guinness (1765–1841)
      - Francis Hart Vicesimus Guinness (1819–1891); New Zealand magistrate
        - Sir Arthur Guinness (1846–1913); Speaker of the New Zealand House of Representatives
    - Arthur Guinness II (1768–1855); married firstly Anne Lee, and secondly Maria Barker
      - Sir Benjamin Lee Guinness, 1st Baronet (1798–1868); married Elizabeth Guinness
        - Arthur Guinness, Baron Ardilaun (1840–1915); married Lady Olivia Charlotte Hedges-White (1850–1925)
        - Benjamin Lee Guinness II (1842–1900); married Lady Henrietta St Lawrence (1851–1935)
          - Sir Algernon Arthur St Lawrence Lee Guinness, 3rd Baronet (1883–1954); married Winifred Hall (died 1978)
            - Susan Rosemary Lee Guinness (b. 1931)
          - Kenelm Lee Guinness (1887–1937); married and divorced Josephine Strangman
            - Sir Kenelm Guinness, 4th Baronet (1928–2011); married Jane Fasset Nevin
              - Sir Kenelm Ernest Lee Guinness, 5th Baronet (b. 1962); married Melissa Ann Wheeley
                - Fiona St. Lawrence Lee Guinness (b. 2003)
                - Kenelm Arthur Lee Guinness (b. 2005)
              - Sean St. Lawrence Lee Guinness (b. 1966); married Christine Leslie Black
            - Geraldine Guinness
          - Nigel Digby Lee Guinness (1893–1974)
        - Edward Guinness, 1st Earl of Iveagh (1847–1927); married Adelaide Maria Guinness (1844–1916)
          - Rupert Guinness, 2nd Earl of Iveagh (1874–1967); married Lady Gwendolen Onslow (1881–1966)
            - Arthur Guinness, Viscount Elveden (1912–1945)
              - Benjamin Guinness, 3rd Earl of Iveagh (1937–1992); married Miranda Smiley (1939–2010)
                - Arthur Edward Guinness, 4th Earl of Iveagh (born 1969)
            - Lady Honor Guinness (1909–1976); married Henry Channon
              - Paul Channon (1935–2007)
            - Lady Brigid Guinness (1920–1995); married Prince Frederick of Prussia
              - Prince Frederick Nicholas of Prussia (born 3 May 1946); married the Hon. Victoria Lucinda Mancroft (born 1952)
              - Princess Antonia of Prussia (born 28 April 1955); married Charles Wellesley, 9th Duke of Wellington
                - Arthur Wellesley, Marquess of Douro (born 31 January 1978); married Jemma Kidd
                  - Lady Mae Madeleine Wellesley (b. 2010)
                  - Arthur Darcy Wellesley, Earl of Mornington (b. 2010)
                  - Lord Alfred Wellesley (b. 2014)
                - Lady Honor Victoria Wellesley (b. 1979); married the Hon. Orlando William Montagu
                - Lady Mary Wellesley (b. 1986)
                - Lady Charlotte Wellesley (b. 1990); married Alejandro Santo Domingo
          - Hon. Arthur Ernest Guinness (1876–1949); married Marie Clothilde Russell
            - Aileen Guinness (1904–1999)
            - Maureen Guinness (1907–1998); married Basil Hamilton-Temple-Blackwood, 4th Marquess of Dufferin and Ava (1909–1945)
              - Sheridan Hamilton-Temple-Blackwood, 5th Marquess of Dufferin and Ava (1938–1988); married his fourth cousin Serena Belinda (Lindy) Rosemary Guinness
              - Lady Caroline Blackwood (1931–1996); married firstly Lucian Freud, secondly Israel Citkowitz, and thirdly Robert Lowell
            - Oonagh Guinness (1910–1995); married Dominick Browne, 4th Baron Oranmore and Browne
              - Garech Browne (1939–2018)
              - Tara Browne (1945–1966)
          - Walter Edward Guinness, 1st Baron Moyne (1880–1944)
            - Bryan Guinness, 2nd Baron Moyne (1905–1992)
              - Jonathan Guinness, 3rd Baron Moyne (1930–2026); married firstly Ingrid Olivia Georgia Wyndham in 1951, secondly Suzanne Lisney in 1964, and had three children with Susan Mary Taylor
                - (of 1st) Hon. Catherine Ingrid Guinness (born 1952); married firstly James Charteris, 13th Earl of Wemyss, in 1983, and secondly Robert Fleetwood Hesketh in 1990
                  - Francis Richard Charteris, Lord Elcho (b. 1984)
                  - Lady Mary Charteris (b. 1987); married Robertson Furze
                - (of 1st) Hon. Jasper Jonathon Richard Guinness (1954–2011); married Camilla Alexandra Uniacke in 1985
                - (of 1st ) Valentine Guy Bryan Guinness, 4th Baron Moyne (born 1959); married Lucinda "Lulu" Rivett-Carnac
                - (of 2nd) Hon. Sebastian Walter Denis Guinness (born 1964); married firstly Silvie Dominique Fleury in 1987, and secondly Peggy Stephaich in 1995
                - (of 2nd) Hon. Daphne Suzannah Diana Guinness (born 1967); married Spyros Niarchos in 1987
                - (of 3) Diana Gloria Isolde Rose Dimilo Taylor (born 1981)
                - (of 3) Aster Sophia Mary Taylor (born 1984)
                - (of 3) Thomas Julian William Jon Taylor (born 1986)
              - Hon. Desmond Guinness(1931–2020)
                - Patrick Guinness (born 1958)
                  - Jasmine Guinness (born 1976)
                - Marina Guinness
              - Hon. Rosaleen Elisabeth Guinness (born 1937)
              - Hon. Diarmid Edward Guinness (born 1938)
              - Hon. Fiona Evelyn Guinness (born 1940)
              - Hon. Dr Finn Benjamin Guinness (born 1945)
              - Hon. Thomasin Margaret Guinness (born 1947)
              - Hon. Kieran Arthur Guinness (born 1949)
                - Malachy Guinness (born 1986)
              - Hon. Catriona Rose Guinness (born 1950)
              - Hon. Erskine Stuart Richard Guinness (born 1953)
              - Hon. Mirabel Jane Guinness (born 1956)
            - Hon. Grania Guinness (1920–1994); married Oswald Phipps, 4th Marquess of Normanby
              - Constantine Phipps, 5th Marquess of Normanby (born 1954)
        - Anne Lee Guinness (1839–1889); married William Plunket, 4th Baron Plunket
          - William Plunket, 5th Baron Plunket (1864–1920)
          - Benjamin Plunket (1870–1947)
          - Olive Plunket; married Peter Wentworth-Fitzwilliam, 8th Earl Fitzwilliam
            - Lady Juliet Wentworth-Fitzwilliam (born 1935); married firstly Victor Hervey, 6th Marquess of Bristol, secondly Somerset de Chair, and thirdly Dr. Christopher Tadgell
              - Lord Nicholas Hervey (1961–1998)
    - John Grattan Guinness (1783–1850)
      - John Grattan Guinness (died 1871)
        - Samuel Guinness (1851–1940)
          - James Henry Guinness (1879–1952)
            - Gerald Henry Grattan Guinness (1909–1985)
              - Ivor Grattan-Guinness (1941–2014)
      - Henry Grattan Guinness (1835–1910); Protestant missionary
        - Harry Grattan Guinness (1861–1915); Protestant missionary and first leader of Regions Beyond Missionary Union
          - Annie Geraldine "Gudruna" Guinness (1888–1981)
          - Ruth Eileen (Guinness) Fisher (1900–1982), youngest child of 9, wife of Sir Ronald Fisher, married 26 April 1917.
            - George Fisher (1919–1943), R.A.F. pilot, killed in action in the Mediterranean theater in late 1943 at age 24
            - Katie Fisher (1921–1921), died in infancy after surgery to remove a pebble from her lung (she inhaled it after an accident in which her toddler brother George poured pebbles in her mouth at the beach)
            - Harry Fisher (1924–2005)
            - Margaret Fisher (1925–2010)
            - Joan Fisher Box (b. 1926), author of R. A. Fisher: The Life of a Scientist
            - Phyllis Fisher (b. 1929)
            - Elizabeth Fisher (dates unknown)
            - Rose Fisher (dates unknown)
            - June Fisher (1929–1995), president of the National Union of Teachers
          - Howard Wyndham Guinness (1903–1979)
        - Gershom Whitfield Guinness (1869–1927), missionary in China
          - Henry Whitfield Guinness (1908–1996)
            - Os Guinness (born 1941)
        - Mary Geraldine Guinness Taylor (1865–1949), missionary in China and a writer
  - Samuel Guinness (died 1795)
    - Richard Guinness (1755–1829)
      - Robert Rundell Guinness (1789–1857), founder of Guinness Mahon
        - Richard Seymour Guinness (1826–1915)
          - Robert Darley Guinness (1858–1938)
            - Elizabeth Muriel Smythe Guinness (1890–1974)
          - Benjamin Seymour Guinness (1868–1947), Prince (life title created by the King of Italy as husband of an Italian Duchess)
            - Thomas "Loel" Guinness (1906–1988), married firstly Hon. Joan Yarde-Buller (1908–1997), followed by Lady Isabel Manners (1918–2008), and finally Gloria Rubio y Alatorre (1913–1980)
              - Patrick Benjamin Guinness (1931–1965), married Dolores von Fürstenberg-Hedringen (1936–2012)
                - Maria Alexandra Guinness (born 1956), married Count de Quatrebarbes
                - Loel Patrick Guinness (born 1957)
                - Victoria Guinness (born 1960), later Victoria Niarchos following her marriage to Philip Niarchos
              - William Loel Seymour Guinness (born 1939), married Agnes Elizabeth Lynn Guinness (born 1942)
                - Sheridan William Guinness (born 1972)
                - Thomas Seymour Guinness (born 1973)
                - Chloë Belinda Guinness (born 1976)
              - Serena Belinda (Lindy) Rosemary Guinness (born 1941), married her fourth cousin Sheridan Hamilton-Temple-Blackwood, 5th Marquess of Dufferin and Ava
            - Meraud Guinness (1904–1993)
            - Tanis Guinness (1908–1993)
        - Henry Guinness (1829–1893)
          - Henry Guinness (1858–1945)
            - Judy Guinness (1910–1952)
          - Lucy Guinness (1870–1950), married Philip de László (1869–1937)
          - Eustace Guinness (1860–1901)
            - Humphrey Patrick Guinness (1902–1986)
          - Howard Rundell Guinness (1863–1937)
            - Edward Douglas Guinness (1893–1983)
              - Sir Howard Christian Sheldon Guinness (1932–2019)
              - Sir John Guinness (1935–2020)
            - Sir Arthur Rundell Guinness (1895–1951)
              - James Edward Alexander Rundell Guinness (1924–2006)
                - Hugo Guinness (born 1959)
                - Sabrina Guinness (born 1955)
                - Anita Patience Guinness (born 1957), married Amschel Rothschild
                - Julia Samuel (born 1959)
              - Ivan Douglas Rundell Guinness (1927–1956)
                - Kevin Michael Rundell Guinness (born 1953), married Peta "Bunny" Ellis (born 1955)
          - Richard Noel Guinness (1870–1960)
            - Henry Eustace Guinness (1897–1972)
              - John Henry Guinness (1935–1988), married Jennifer Hollwey (1937–2016)
        - Mary Catherine Ferguson (1823–1905)
      - Richard Samuel Guinness (1797–1857), MP
        - Adelaide Maria Guinness (1844–1916)

== See also ==
- Baron Ardilaun (created 1880)
- Baron Moyne (created 1932)
- Castletown House – Palladian country house in County Kildare, Ireland
- Earl of Iveagh (created 1919)
- Families in the Oireachtas – Political families of Ireland
- Farmleigh – State guest house and estate in Dublin, Ireland
- Guinness baronets – Baronetcy in the Baronetage of the United Kingdom
- Guinness share-trading fraud – Major business scandal of the 1980s
- Guinness Trust
- Iveagh Gardens – National park in Dublin, Ireland
- Iveagh House – Georgian house and foreign ministry headquarters in Dublin, Ireland
- Iveagh Trust
- Kenwood House – Country house in Hampstead, London
- Lions Gate Bridge – Suspension bridge in Vancouver, Canada
- St. James's Gate Brewery
