= Patrick Guinness =

Irish writer and historian

Patrick Guinness KCEG KLJ
- Born: Patrick Desmond Carl Alexander Guinness; 8 January 1956 (age 70); Dublin, Ireland
- Spouse(s): Liz Casey Louise Arundel (m. 1990)
- Children: 5, including Jasmine
- Parent(s): Desmond Guinness; Hermione Maria-Gabrielle von Urach
- Writing career
- Language: Historian

Patrick Desmond Carl Alexander Guinness (born 1 August 1956) is an Anglo-Irish historian and author and one of the heirs of the Guinness business dynasty. Son of Desmond and Mariga Guinness, née Princess Hermione Maria-Gabrielle von Urach, he was educated at Winchester College and Trinity College Dublin. He is a financial analyst. He is a former representative of Sotheby's in Ireland.

== Historian ==
An historian, Patrick Guinness, member of the Guinness family, wrote the first biography of Arthur Guinness, the founder of the Guinness Brewery dynasty. He has lectured on genetic genealogy relating to the early Irish dynasties and Viking Ireland, and has sponsored academic research on Irish genetics. He was a council member of the County Kildare Archaeological Society (2004–2014).

He has produced monographs on the early history of the Friendly Brothers of St Patrick in Kildare, 1758–91; on the depositions from Kildare on the outbreak of the Irish Rebellion of 1641; and on the Irish Jacobite ancestry of the Mitford family (privately published). In 2016, he addressed the FT Weekend Oxford Literary Festival.

== Family ==
His daughter, by his first marriage to Liz Casey, is the model Jasmine Guinness. He married Louise Arundel in 1990, and the couple have four children: Celeste, Tom, Lily, and George.

In 2015, he gave a lecture on Irish history at the Princess Grace Irish Library in Monaco.

As at November 2026, he is second in the line of succession to Baron Moyne title.

Partly because of previous family involvements, he is a trustee of the Iveagh Trust social housing provider and is a former president of the Irish Georgian Society.

== Honours ==
In September 2010, he became a Knight of Justice of the Military and Hospitaller Order of St. Lazarus of Jerusalem at a ceremony in St. Patrick's Cathedral in Dublin. In 2013, he was made a Knight Commander of the Order of the Eagle of Georgia by prince David Bagration-Mukhranski.

On 10 March 2015, the Texas Senate passed a resolution sponsored by Senator Kirk Watson welcoming Guinness to the Texas State Capitol.

== Ancestry ==
Ancestors of Patrick Guinness

16. Edward Guinness, 1st Earl of Iveagh
8. Walter Guinness, 1st Baron Moyne
17. Adelaide Guinness
4. Bryan Guinness, 2nd Baron Moyne
18. Shipley Erskine, 14th Earl of Buchan
9. Lady Evelyn Erskine
19. Rosalie Sartoris
2. Desmond Guinness
20. Bertram Freeman-Mitford, 1st Baron Redesdale
10. David Freeman-Mitford, 2nd Baron Redesdale
21. Lady Clementina Ogilvy
5. Diana Mitford
22. Thomas Gibson Bowles
11. Sydney Bowles
23. Jessica Evans-Gordon
1. Patrick Guinness
24. Wilhelm, Duke of Urach
12. Wilhelm Karl, Duke of Urach
25. Princess Florestine of Monaco
6. Albrecht von Urach
26. Karl Theodor, Duke in Bavaria
13. Duchess Amalie in Bavaria
27. Princess Sophie of Saxony
3. Mariga von Urach
28. John Blackadder
14. John Blackadder of Chirnside
29. Janet Beveridge
7. Rosemary Blackadder
30. Peter Wilson
15. Anna Wilson
31. Frederike Thesen

Lines of succession
Preceded by Andrea da Silva Araujo	Line of succession to the British throne descendant of Sophia Dorothea of Hanover, daughter of George I	Succeeded by Thomas Guinness
