= Farmleigh =

State guest house and estate in Dublin, Ireland

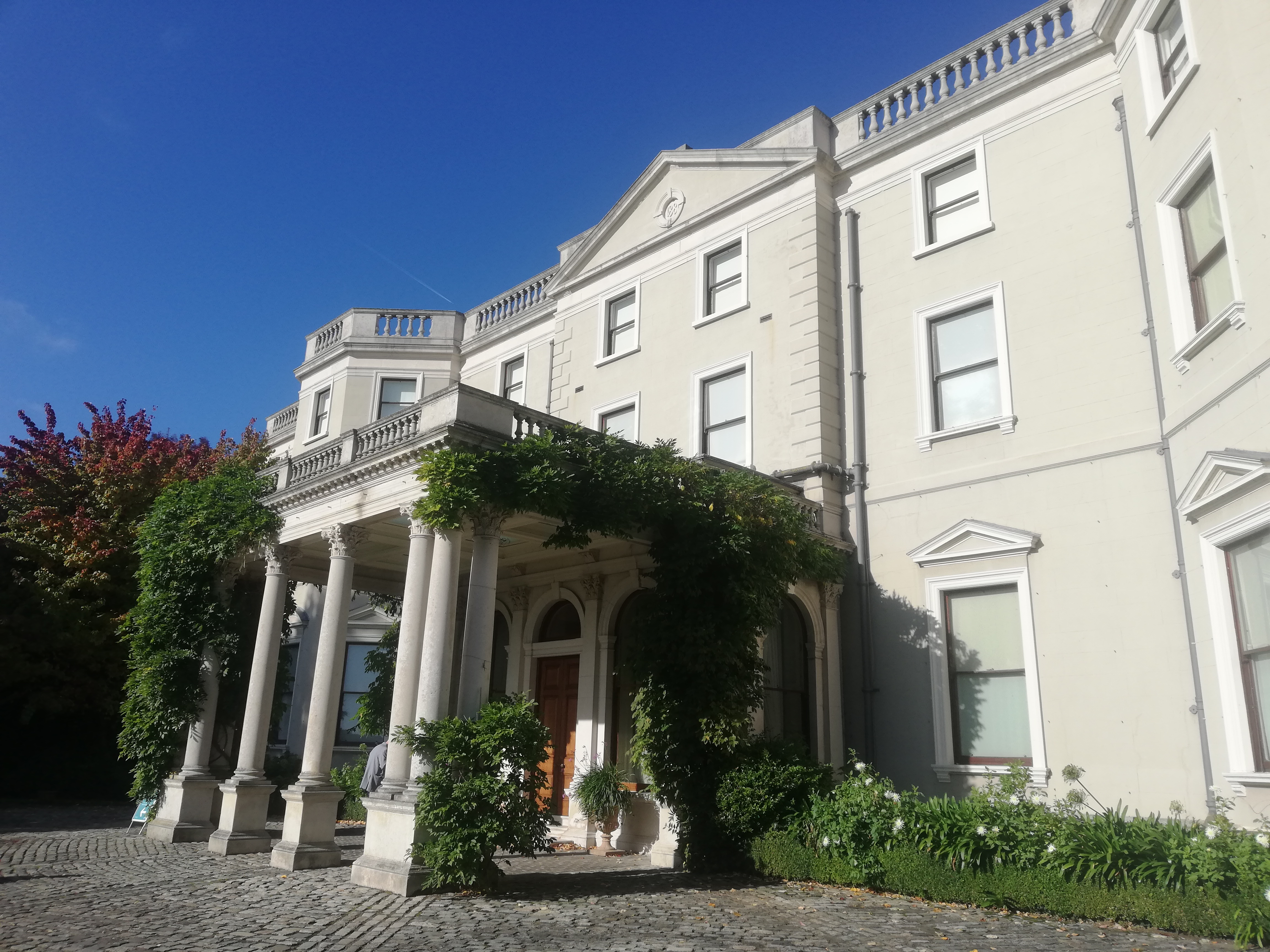
- Façade

- Location within Dublin

General information
- Architectural style: Edwardian
- Location: Castleknock, Dublin, Ireland
- Coordinates: 53.365°N 6.36°W
- Current tenants: Used when Heads of Government and Heads of State visit Ireland.
- Construction started: 18th century (with significant reconstruction from 1881)
- Renovated: 1881–1884, 1896, 1901, 1999–2001
- Renovation cost: €23 million (for 1999 works)
- Owner: Government of Ireland

Website
- www.farmleigh.ie

Farmleigh is the official Irish state guest house. It was formerly one of the Dublin residences of the Guinness family. It is situated on an elevated position above the River Liffey to the northwest of the Phoenix Park, in Castleknock. The estate of 78 acres (32 ha) consists of extensive private gardens with stands of mature cypress, pine and oak trees, a boating pond, walled garden, sunken garden, out offices and a herd of rare native Kerry cattle. It was purchased by the Government of Ireland from Edward Guinness, 4th Earl of Iveagh in 1999 for €29.2 million. A state body—the Office of Public Works (OPW)—spent in the region of €23 million restoring the house, gardens and curvilinear glasshouses, bringing the total cost to the state to €52.2 million. Farmleigh was opened to the public in July 2001.

== History ==
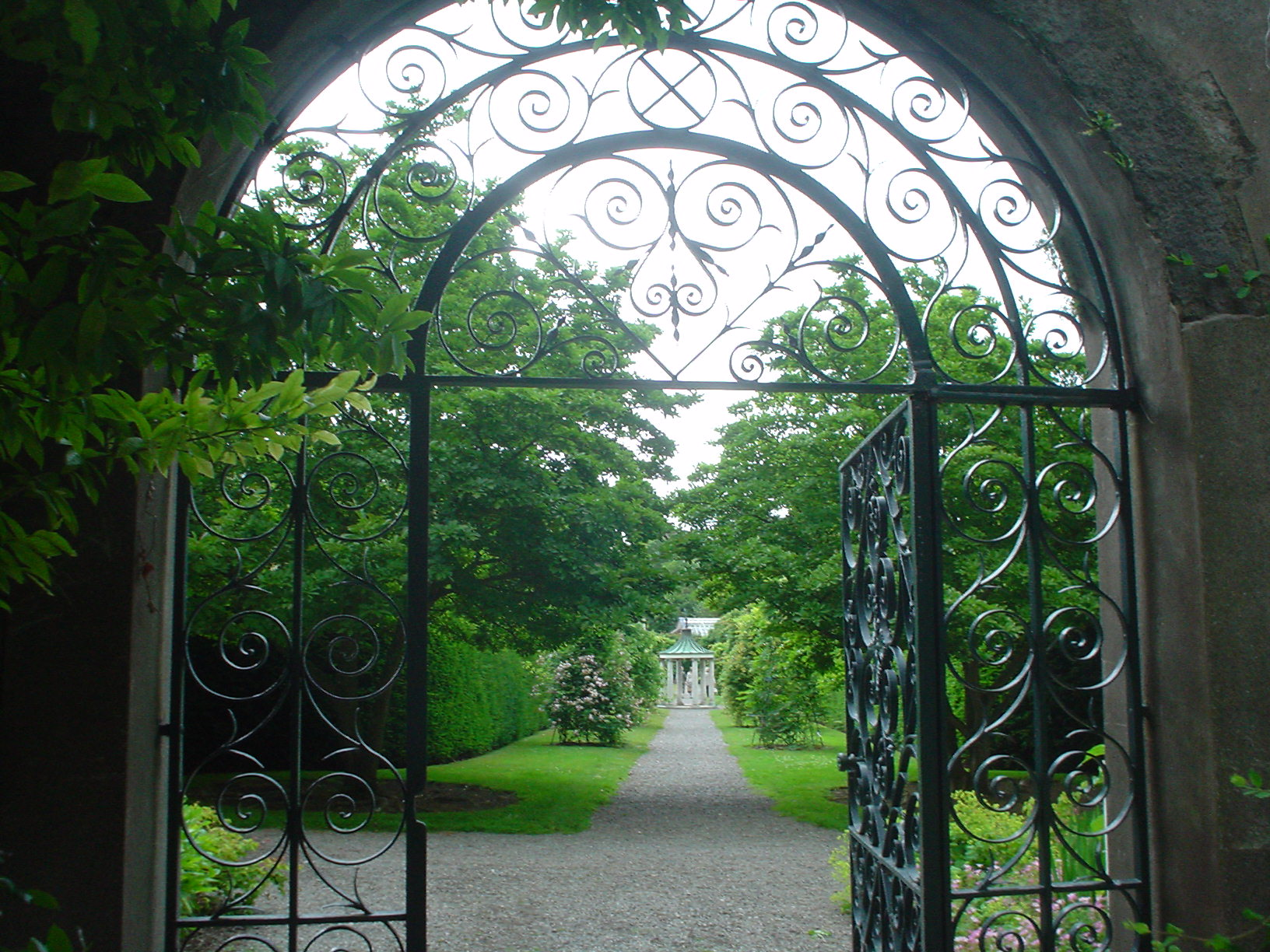
Garden gate at Farmleigh

Farmleigh was once a small (two-storey) Georgian house built in the mid-18th century. It originally belonged to the Coote and then Trench families. Farmleigh Bridge was added to the estate in the 1870s to carry electricity lines from the mill race turbine on the Strawberry Beds to the house.

In 1873, the house and estate were purchased by Edward Guinness (1847–1927) when he married his cousin Adelaide Guinness. He was a great-grandson of Arthur Guinness and was created Baron Iveagh in 1891, Viscount Iveagh in 1905 and Earl of Iveagh in 1919.

Guinness commissioned a major renovation and extension programme to extend the house to the west and add a third floor. These works took place between 1881 and 1884 and were completed to designs by Irish architect James Franklin Fuller. A ballroom was added in 1896, designed by the Scottish architect William Young. The conservatory was added in 1901.

As many of the house's features were commissioned by Lord Iveagh, visitors gain some insight into his character from the landscaped gardens, classical architecture, and sober symmetrical layout. There are also tapestries on display, which the 1st Earl collected while travelling through Europe as a young man. The Earl's library, on loan to the state, contains some of the earliest books printed in Ireland. Farmleigh eventually passed to Rupert Guinness, 2nd Earl of Iveagh, and remained in the ownership of the Guinness family throughout the rest of the 20th century.

== Current use ==
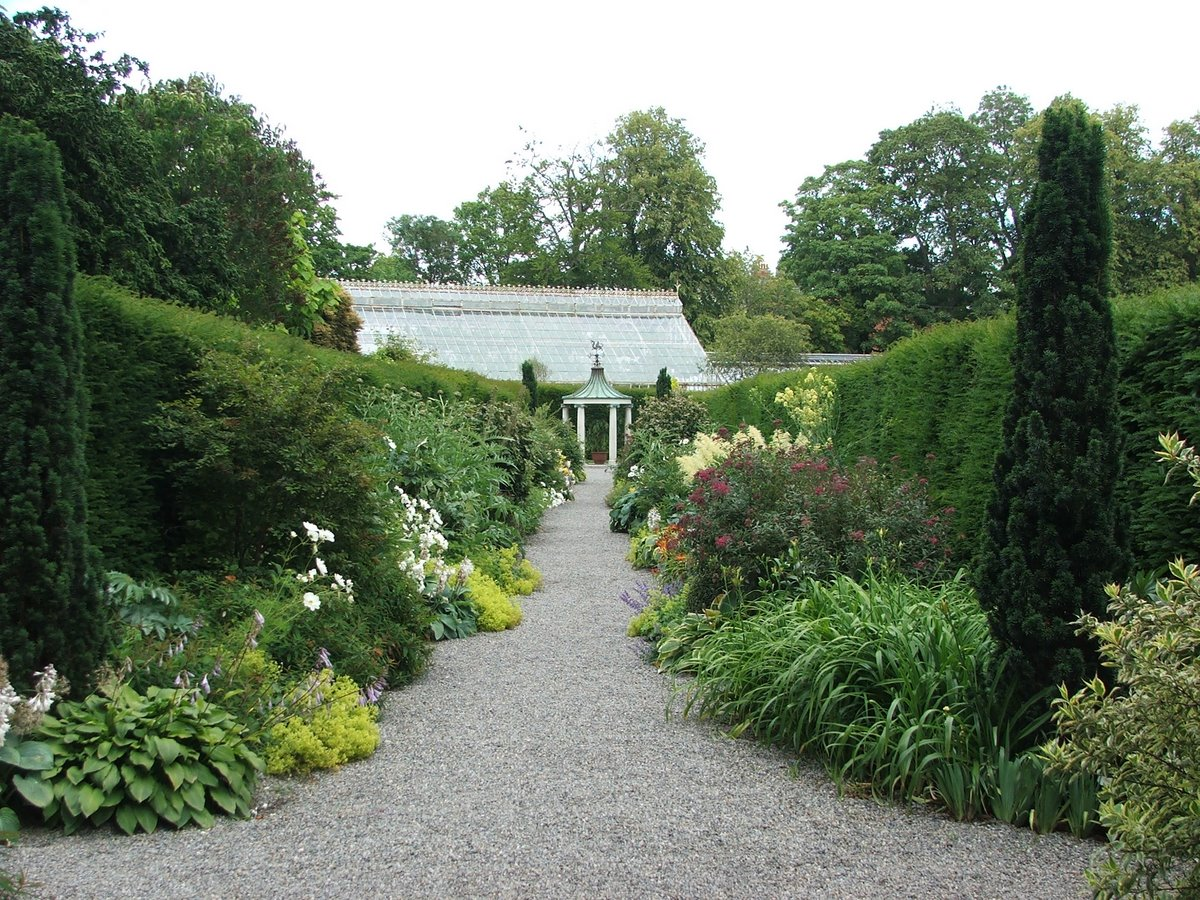
Part of the estate gardens

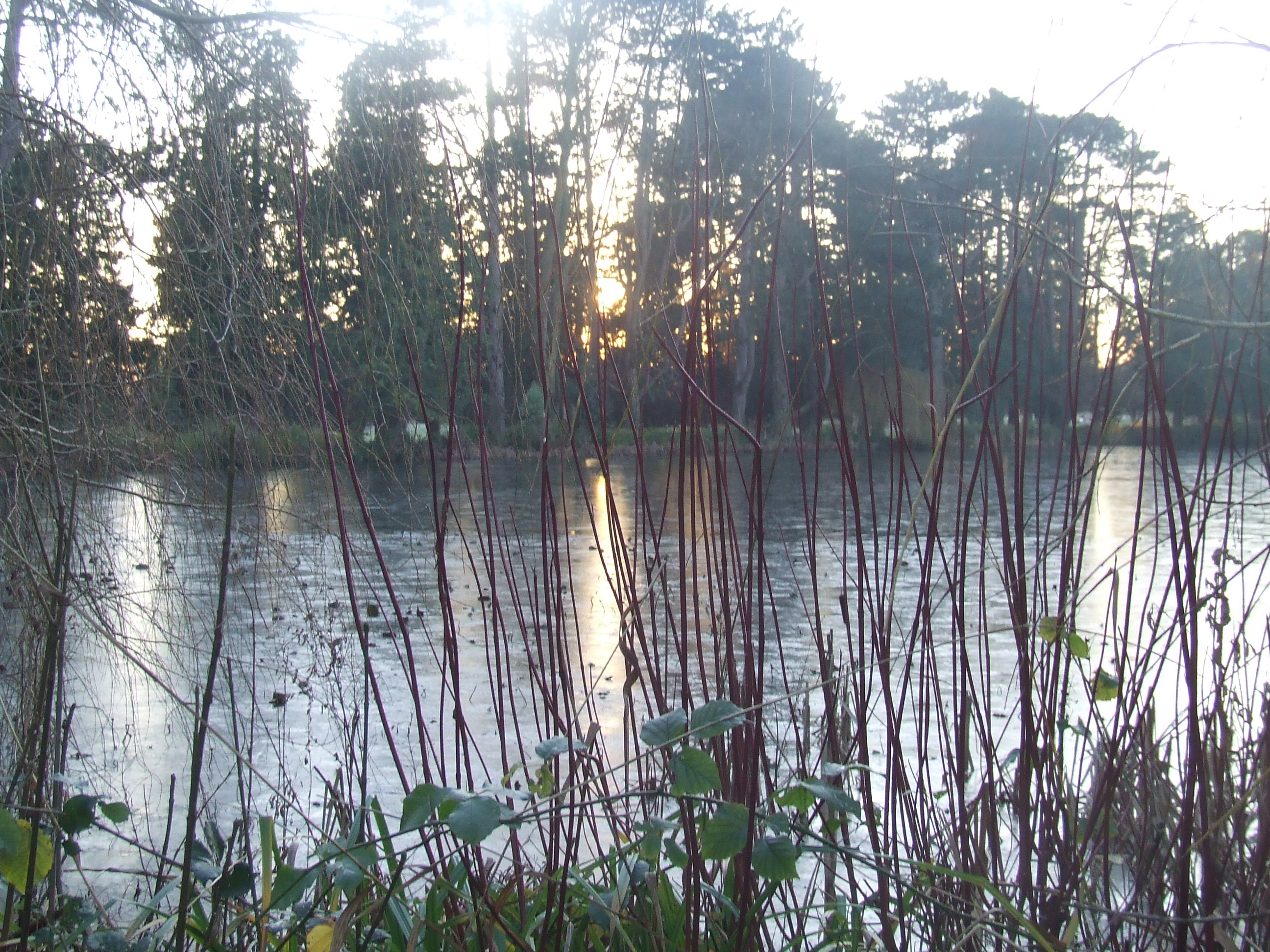
Sunset at the boat lake in December 2014

The estate was purchased from the 4th Earl of Iveagh by the State in 1999. The official purpose for the €29.2 million purchase, and subsequent expenditure of €23 million in refurbishment, was that it would be used for state purposes. Specifically, it is designated as "an official State guest house for visiting heads of State and dignitaries. Some notable visitors have been hosted at Farmleigh including the Premier of China, the Prime Minister of Ethiopia, the King of Malaysia, British Prime Minister Tony Blair, the Governor-General of New Zealand, Queen Elizabeth II of the United Kingdom, and U.S. President Joe Biden. However, the estate only hosted seven visiting dignitaries in 2006 (the most in one year), six in 2008, and only two the following year. Also in 2009, 246,000 members of the public visited the estate.

In 2006 it was announced by the Office of Public Works (OPW) that the Steward's Lodge which is located in the grounds of Farmleigh had been renovated. It was speculated at the time that the lodge was to become an official residence of the Taoiseach. Former Taoiseach Brian Cowen used the lodge for this purpose on occasion, staying at the lodge while in Dublin. His successor, Enda Kenny, has also stayed on occasion at the Steward's Lodge.

Today Farmleigh is operated by the OPW and the estate and gardens are largely open to the public, with the house closed except for organised tours. Seasonal events, such as craft and food markets, are held on the grounds. The estate has also been used as the venue for the RTÉ proms, a public concert series that took place each summer in a large marquee erected on the grounds.
