= Baron Moyne =

Barony in the Peerage of the United Kingdom

- Per saltire gules and azure, a lion rampant or; on a chief ermine, two ducal coronets each enfiling as many arrows in saltire of the third
- Creation date: 21 January 1932
- Created by: King George V
- Peerage: United Kingdom
- First holder: The Hon. Walter Guinness
- Present holder: Valentine Guinness, 4th Baron Moyne
- Heir presumptive: Hon. Sebastian Walter Denis Guinness
- Remainder to: the 1st Baron's heirs male of the body lawfully begotten
- Motto: Noli judicare ("Judge Not")

Baron Moyne, of Bury St Edmunds in the County of Suffolk, is a title in the Peerage of the United Kingdom. It was created in 1932 for the Hon. Walter Guinness, a Conservative politician. A member of the prominent Guinness brewing family, he was the third son of the 1st Earl of Iveagh, who was himself the third son of Sir Benjamin Guinness, 1st Baronet, of Ashford.

His son, the 2nd Baron, was a poet and novelist. He was the first husband of Diana Mitford, one of the famous Mitford sisters, who went on to marry the fascist Sir Oswald Mosley.

As of 2026, the title is held by their grandson, the 4th Baron, who succeeded in October 2026. As a male agnatic descendant of both the 1st Earl of Iveagh and the first Guinness baronet of Ashford, he is also in remainder to those two titles.

== Barons Moyne (1932) ==
- Walter Edward Guinness, 1st Baron Moyne (1880–1944)
- Bryan Walter Guinness, 2nd Baron Moyne (1905–1992)
- Jonathan Bryan Guinness, 3rd Baron Moyne (1930–2026)
  - Hon. Jasper Jonathan Richard Guinness (1954–2011)
- Valentine Guy Bryan Guinness, 4th Baron Moyne (b. 1959)

The heir presumptive is his half-brother, the Hon. Sebastian Walter Denis Guinness (b. 1964).
The heir presumptive's heir presumptive is his cousin, Patrick Guinness (b. 1956).

== Title succession chart ==
Guinness family tree including: Guinness baronets, Barons Ardilaun, Barons Moyne, and Earls of Iveagh

Arthur Guinness; 1725–1803
Arthur Guinness II; 1768–1855
Guinness baronetcy of Ashford, 1867
Benjamin Lee Guinness; 1798–1868; 1st Baronet
Baron Ardilaun, 1880 | Guinness baronetcy of Castleknock, 1885; Baron Iveagh, 1891; Viscount Iveagh, 1905; Earl of Iveagh and Viscount Elveden, 1919
Arthur Edward Guinness; 1840–1915; Baron Ardilaun, 2nd Baronet | Benjamin Lee Guinness II; 1842–1900 | Edward Cecil Guinness; 1847–1927; 1st Earl of Iveagh, etc.
Barony Ardilaun extinct
Baron Moyne
Algernon Guinness; 1883–1954; 3rd Baronet | Kenelm Edward Lee Guinness; 1887–1937 | Rupert Edward Cecil Lee Guinness; 1874–1967; 2nd Earl of Iveagh | Walter Edward Guinness; 1880–1944; 1st Baron Moyne
Kenelm Guinness; 1928–2011; 4th Baronet | Richard Guinness; 1906–1906 | Arthur Guinness; 1912–1945 styled Viscount Elveden | Bryan Walter Guinness; 1905–1992; 2nd Baron Moyne
Kenelm Guinness b. 1962; 5th Baronet | Benjamin Guinness; 1937–1992; 3rd Earl of Iveagh | Jonathan Bryan Guinness; 1930–2026; 3rd Baron Moyne | Desmond Walter Guinness; 1931–2020
Kenelm Guinness b. 2005 | Edward Guinness b. 1969; 4th Earl of Iveagh | Jasper Jonathan Richard Guinness; 1954–2011 | Valentine Guy Bryan Guinness b. 1959; 4th Baron Moyne | Sebastian Walter Denis Guinness b. 1964 | Patrick Desmond Carl Alexander Guinness b. 1956
Arthur Benjamin Geoffrey Guinness b. 2002 styled Viscount Elveden | Tom Guinness b. 1991

== See also ==
- Guinness baronets, of Ashford
- Earl of Iveagh
- Guinness family
