= Adelaide Guinness, Viscountess Iveagh =

Irish aristocrat

The Right Honourable The Viscountess Iveagh
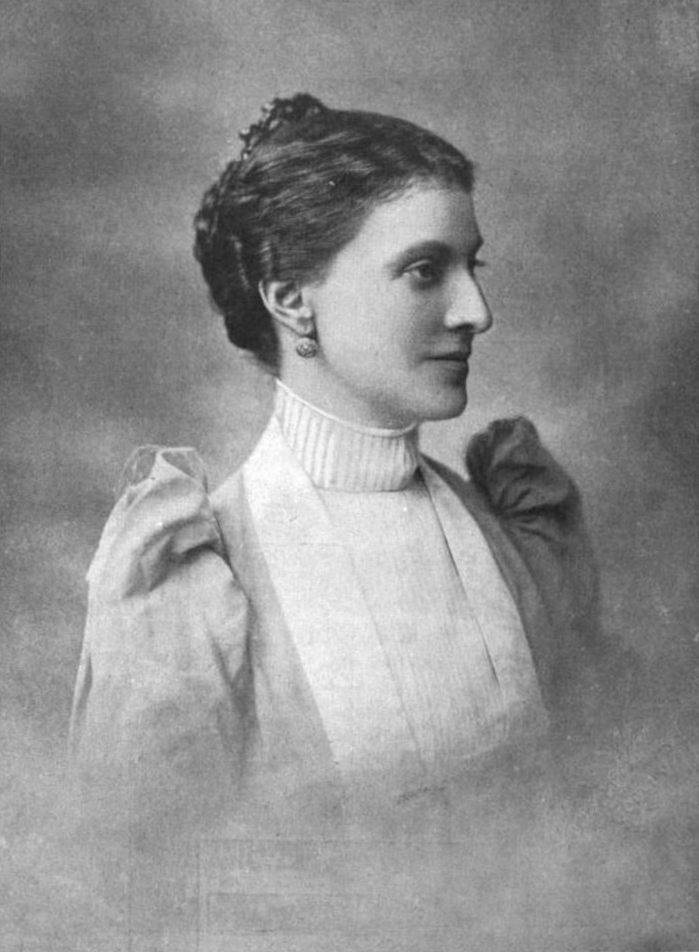
- Guinness in 1899
- Born: 1844
- Died: 1916 (aged 71–72)
- Spouse: Edward Guinness, 1st Viscount Iveagh (m. 1873; died 1916)
- Children: Rupert Guinness, 2nd Earl of Iveagh; Walter Guinness, 1st Baron Moyne; Ernest Guinness
- Parent(s): Richard Samuel Guinness (father); Katherine Jenkinson

Adelaide Maria Guinness, Viscountess Iveagh (1844–1916) was an Anglo-Irish aristocrat. She was a member of the Guinness family by birth and by marriage.

== Early life and family ==
Lady Iveagh was born Adelaide Maria Guinness in 1844. She was a member of the banking branch of the Guinness family, as the daughter of Richard Samuel Guinness, a barrister and Irish Conservative Party politician who sat in the House of Commons of the United Kingdom for Kinsale. Her mother, Katherine Jenkins Guinness, was the daughter of Sir Charles Jenkinson, 10th Baronet. Through her mother, she was a descendant of Clan Campbell as the great-granddaughter of Walter Campbell of Shawfield.

She was one of eight children, and her siblings included Colonel Charles Guinness, Sir Reginald R. B. Guinness, and Claude H. C. Guinness.

She was affectionately given the nickname "Dodo" by her family.

== Adult life ==
In 1873, she married her third cousin, Edward Cecil Guinness, who was head of the family's brewing business. Their marriage concentrated the family wealth and tightened control over the brewery business prior to its conversion into a public company. They had three sons:

- Rupert Edward Cecil Lee Guinness, 2nd Earl of Iveagh (1874–1967)
- Hon. (Arthur) Ernest Guinness (1876–1949)
- Walter Edward Guinness, 1st Baron Moyne (1880–1944)

Her husband was elevated to the baronetage in 1885, at which time she became Lady Guinness. In 1891, her husband was elevated to the peerage as Baron Iveagh, at which time she became Lady Iveagh. She became the Viscountess Iveagh when her husband was elevated to the rank of viscount in 1905.

Her most famous portrait was painted circa 1885 by George Elgar Hicks.

She died in 1916, three years before her husband was created Earl of Iveagh and Viscount Elveden.

== In popular culture ==
Lady Iveagh is portrayed by Ann Skelly in the Netflix series House of Guinness.
