= Irish Georgian Society =

Architectural heritage and preservation organisation on the island of Ireland

- Formation: 1958
- Founders: Desmond and Mariga Guinness
- Headquarters: City Assembly House, South William Street, Dublin, Ireland
- Members: Approx. 2,400
- President: David Davies
- Executive director: Donough Cahill
- Website: igs.ie

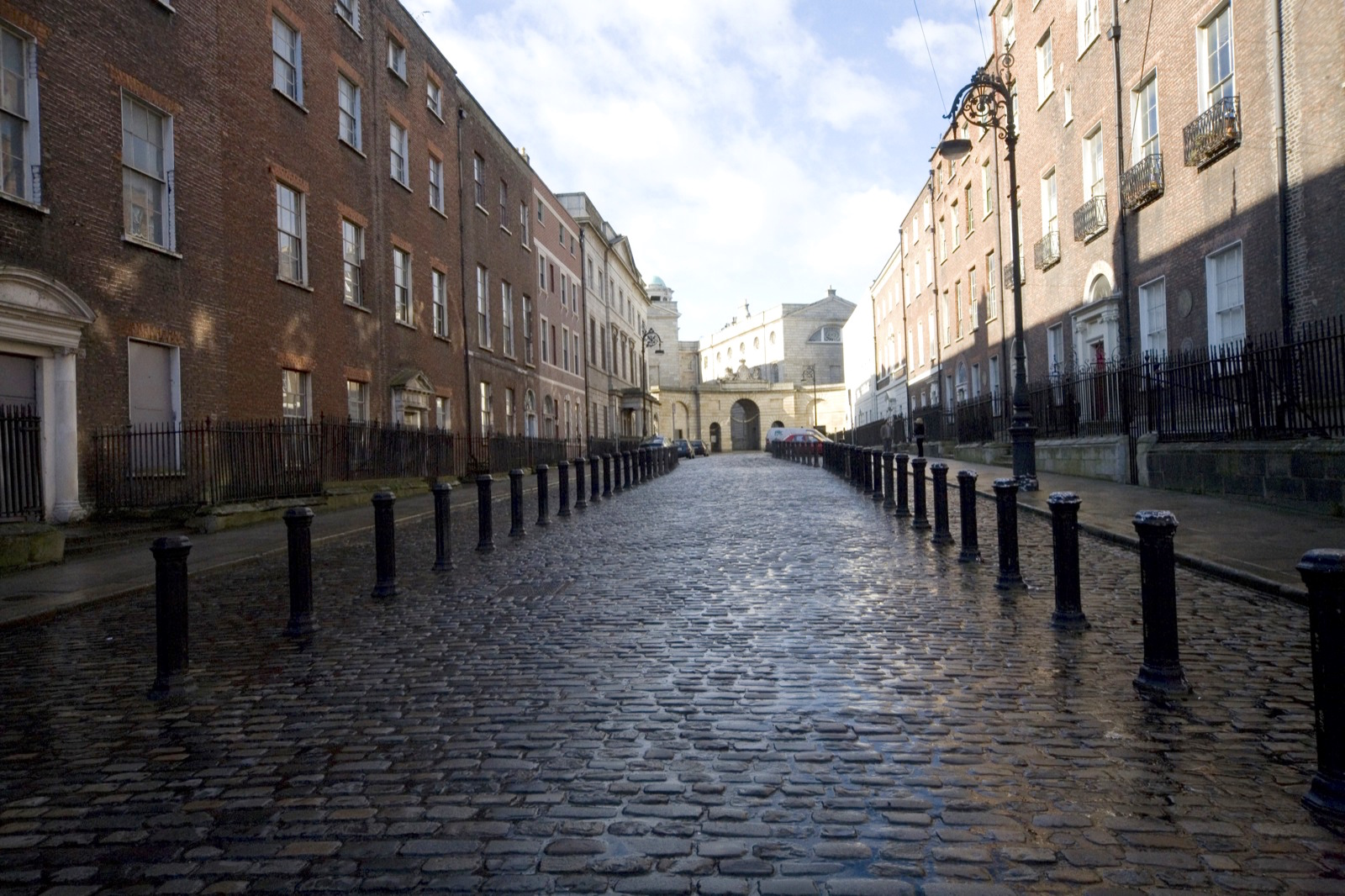
Henrietta Street, Dublin - an example of active conservation work by the society

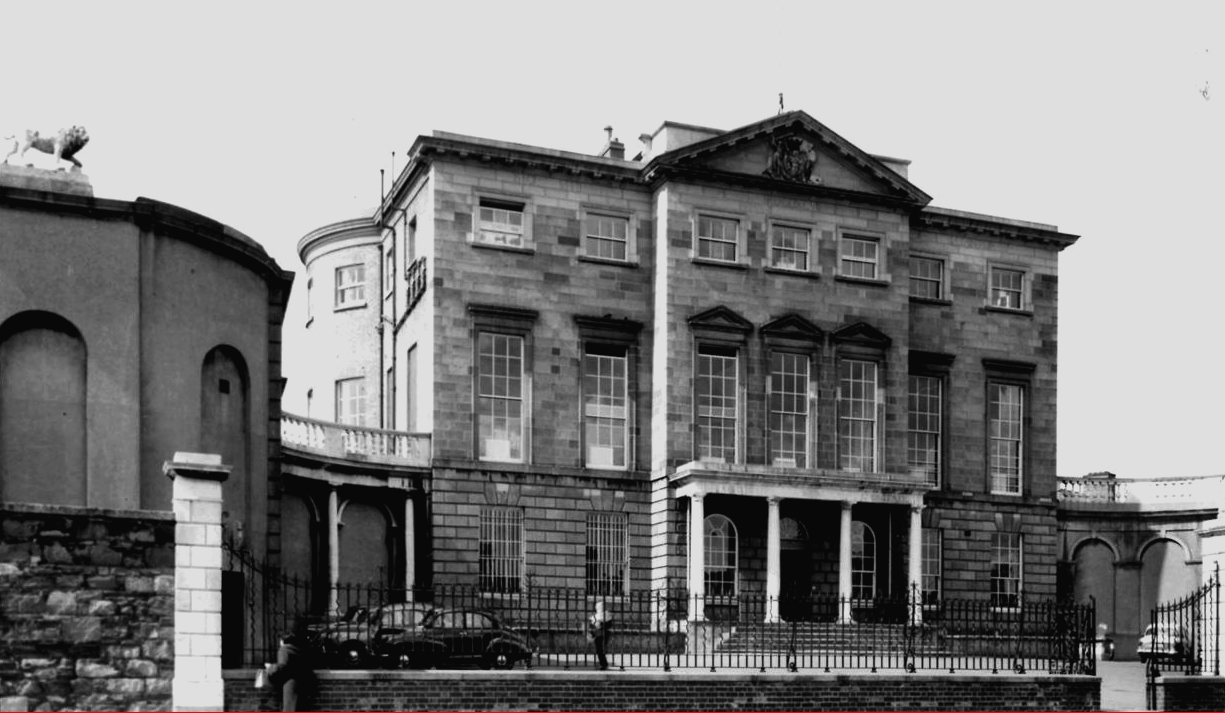
Aldborough House, Dublin - one of the properties now rated as most at risk by the society

The Irish Georgian Society is an architectural heritage and preservation organisation which promotes and aims to encourage an interest in the conservation of distinguished examples of architecture and the allied arts of all periods across Ireland, and records and publishes relevant material. The aims of this membership organisation are pursued by documenting, education, fundraising, grant issuance, planning process participation, lobbying, and member activities; in its first decades, it also conducted considerable hands-on restoration activities.

== History ==
An earlier Georgian Society had been set up in part by John Pentland Mahaffy and functioned from 1908 to 1913; it had no direct connection with the current body although the society deems it to be its predecessor.

The initial catalyst for the establishment of the modern society was the demolition by the Irish government's Office of Public Works of Georgian houses at numbers 2 and 3 Kildare Place in central Dublin, ostensibly to provide rear access to Government Buildings. While the campaign to save the buildings was ultimately unsuccessful, it did help to highlight the plight of other notable buildings in decline and at risk and ignited the spark which motivated like-minded individuals to found the society. In an open letter to The Irish Times in 1957 Desmond Guinness lamented the lapsing of the older Georgian Society and asked whether anyone would object to him restarting it.

The modern society was hence founded in 1958 by Desmond Guinness and his wife Mariga and since that time, a number of buildings of architectural merit have been saved through their work and the work of members and supporters. Among the first structures restored by the society was Conolly's Folly in County Kildare, the image of which is used as the organisation's emblem.

After Desmond Guinness, the next president of the society was Desmond FitzGerald, Knight of Glin, who died in 2011, followed by Patrick Guinness. Other founding members included Percy Le Clerc, the inspector of Irish National Monuments.

In 2006 the Hon. Desmond Guinness was awarded a Europa Nostra prize for the society's preservation activities.

An illustrated book by Robert O'Byrne on the society's first 50 years was published in 2008.

== Membership and funding ==
The society is a membership organisation of about 2,000 members whose purpose is to promote awareness and the protection of Ireland's architectural heritage and decorative arts. The society's work within Ireland was managed by the Irish-registered Irish Georgian Society (IGS), registered as a charity in 1970.

In a major change, in 2008 a new entity called the Irish Georgian Foundation was given charge of the financial and charitable aspects, leaving the IGS as an unincorporated membership body. The boards of both were merged in 2013 for reasons of governance, and the IGF is now the operating legal entity, while the IGS name and logo are retained for emotive purposes, and IGS members support the work of the IGF but have no formal role in its governance or property ownership; they do have a limited role in choosing a nominal head.

There are headquarters in Dublin, and for the US branch, in Chicago.

The conservation efforts are funded by the members' participation in the society's events programme, fundraising at central and chapter level, by donations and bequests and by sales from the society's online book and gift shop. A large proportion of the society's income comes from supporters outside Ireland. In the US, the organisation has been registered as a charity since 1968 as the Irish Georgian Society Inc. In the UK, the organisation fundraises as the "Irish Georgian Trust".

=== Chapters ===
The society has semi-autonomous chapters in a number of locations, including Cork (founded 2003), Limerick (founded 1996), Birr (founded 1993, covering Ireland's midlands since 2015), London (founded 1971), and in Boston, New York and Palm Beach, Florida in the US.

== Activities ==
The activities of the Irish Georgian Society have included the saving of threatened buildings such as Castletown House, County Kildare; Damer House, County Tipperary; Doneraile Court, County Cork; Roundwood, County Laois; the Tailors' Hall, Dublin and 13 Henrietta Street, Dublin, and the restoration of mid-eighteenth-century panelled rooms at Ledwithstown, County Longford; these were led by the first president, Desmond Guinness, and in the early years, his wife also.

Guinness retired from leadership in 1990. Projects since then include the repair of the early nineteenth-century south tower roof at Barmeath Castle, County Louth; the restoration of the pavilion cupolas of Kilshannig, County Cork, built in the 1760s to the designs of the Italian architect Davis Ducart; and, in association with the Department of the Environment, Heritage and Local Government, the World Monuments Fund and the Headfort Trust, the restoration of the Robert Adam decorative schemes at Headfort House, County Meath.

Another major project, which started in 2008, was the restoration of Dublin's 1760s City Assembly House in South William Street, the first purpose-built public exhibition gallery in Great Britain or Ireland. From 1809 it was the debating chamber of Dublin Corporation for nearly a century, and was the scene of many famous speeches by Daniel O'Connell.

The society has also compiled and makes available a list of craftworkers skilled in the maintenance of historic buildings.

The society also publishes a yearly journal Irish Architectural and Decorative Studies.

=== Events ===
The society runs a range of events for a variety of purposes, such as educational, exploratory, instructional (for example for property owners), some of the events for members, some open to the public.

== See also ==
- Georgian Dublin
- Georgian Group
- Dublin Civic Trust
