= Walter Guinness, 1st Baron Moyne =

British politician (1880–1944)

The Right Honourable The Lord Moyne DSO TD PC
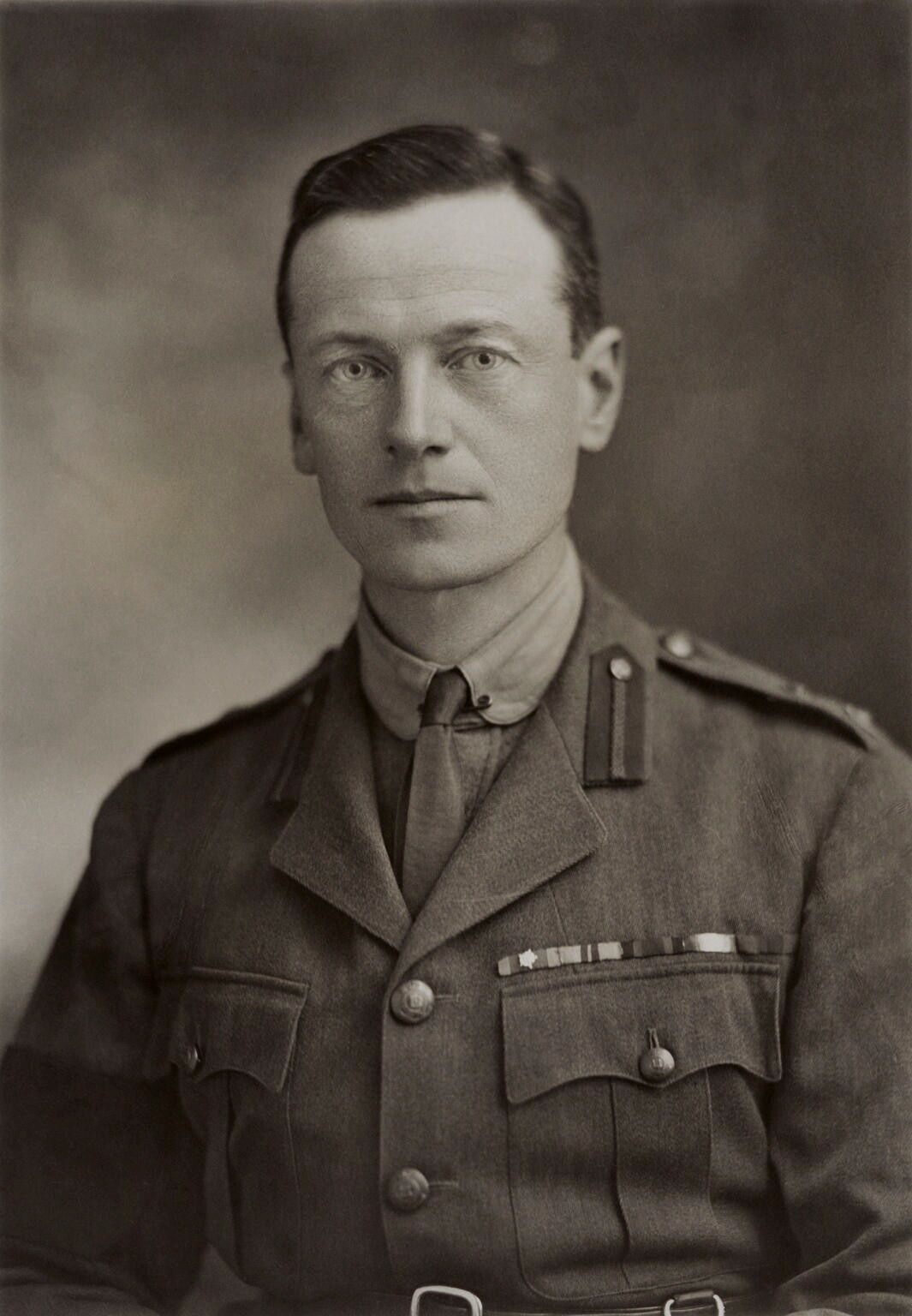
- First World War portrait, 1918

Leader of the House of Lords Secretary of State for the Colonies
- In office 8 February 1941 – 22 February 1942
- Monarch: George VI
- Prime Minister: Sir Winston Churchill
- Preceded by: The Lord Lloyd
- Succeeded by: Viscount Cranborne

Parliamentary Secretary to the Ministry of Agriculture and Fisheries
- In office 10 May 1940 – 8 February 1941 Serving with Tom Williams
- Monarch: George VI
- Prime Minister: Sir Winston Churchill
- Preceded by: The Lord Denham
- Succeeded by: The Duke of Norfolk

Minister of Agriculture and Fisheries
- In office 4 November 1925 – 4 June 1929
- Monarch: George V
- Prime Minister: Stanley Baldwin
- Preceded by: E. F. L. Wood
- Succeeded by: Noel Buxton

Financial Secretary to the Treasury
- In office 5 October 1923 – 23 January 1924
- Monarch: George V
- Prime Minister: Stanley Baldwin
- Preceded by: Sir William Joynson-Hicks
- Succeeded by: William Graham

Parliamentary Under-Secretary of State for War
- In office 31 October 1922 – 5 October 1923
- Monarch: George V
- Prime Minister: Bonar Law; Stanley Baldwin
- Preceded by: Robert Sanders
- Succeeded by: Wilfrid Ashley

Member of the House of Lords Lord Temporal
- In office 21 January 1932 – 6 November 1944; Hereditary peerage
- Preceded by: Peerage created
- Succeeded by: The 2nd Baron Moyne

Member of Parliament for Bury St Edmunds
- In office 24 August 1907 – 27 October 1931
- Preceded by: Frederick Hervey
- Succeeded by: Frank Heilgers

Personal details
- Born: Walter Edward Guinness; 29 March 1880 Dublin, Ireland
- Died: 6 November 1944 (aged 64) Cairo, Egypt
- Party: Conservative
- Spouse: Lady Evelyn Erskine (m. 1903; died 1939)
- Children: 3, including Bryan Guinness, 2nd Baron Moyne
- Parent(s): Edward Guinness, 1st Earl of Iveagh; Adelaide Guinness

Military service
- Allegiance: United Kingdom
- Branch/service: British Army
- Years of service: 1899–1918
- Rank: Brigade major
- Battles/wars: Second Boer War; First World War; Battle of Passchendaele; German spring offensive

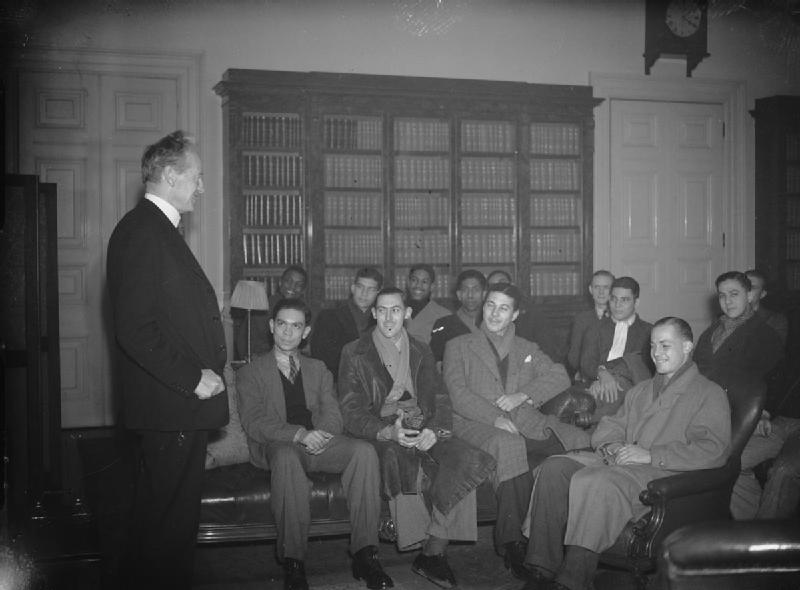
Lord Moyne, Secretary of State for the Colonies, entertaining recruits from Jamaica on their arrival in London for RAF training.

Walter Edward Guinness, 1st Baron Moyne, DSO & Bar, TD, PC (29 March 1880 – 6 November 1944), was a British Conservative politician, soldier and businessman. He served as the British minister of state in the Middle East until November 1944, when he was assassinated by the Zionist terrorist group Lehi in Cairo. The assassination of Lord Moyne sent shock waves through Palestine and the rest of the world.

== Early life and family ==
Walter Guinness was born in Dublin, Ireland, on 29 March 1880, into the prominent Anglo-Irish Guinness family. He was the third and youngest son of Edward Guinness, 1st Earl of Iveagh and Adelaide Maria Guinness; his brothers were Rupert Guinness, 2nd Earl of Iveagh and Hon. Ernest Guinness. His family homes were at Farmleigh near Dublin, and at Elveden Hall in Suffolk. At Eton, Guinness was elected head of 'Pop', a self-appointing group whose members have a status similar to school prefects, and was also appointed as Captain of Boats.

On 24 June 1903, Guinness married Lady Evelyn Hilda Stuart Erskine (1883–1939), third daughter of Shipley Stuart Erskine, 14th Earl of Buchan. They had three children:

- Bryan Walter Guinness, 2nd Baron Moyne (27 October 1905 – 6 July 1992), married Hon. Diana Mitford, one of the Mitford sisters, and had issue, including Jonathan Guinness, 3rd Baron Moyne.
- Hon. Murtogh David Guinness (7 May 1913 – 30 January 2002)
- Hon. Grania Maeve Rosaura Guinness (14 April 1920 – 15 January 2018), married Oswald Phipps, 4th Marquess of Normanby, and had issue, including Constantine Phipps, 5th Marquess of Normanby.

== Military career ==
Guinness joined the yeomanry regiment The Loyal Suffolk Hussars as a second lieutenant on 15 November 1899, and volunteered for service in the Second Boer War, commissioned as a lieutenant in the 44th (Suffolk) Company of the 12th Battalion of the Imperial Yeomanry on 7 February 1900. The company left London on the SS Cornwall for South Africa in early March 1900. According to Wilson, "they had a devil-may-care ethos and distaste for military discipline ... they made lightning raids on Afrikaner positions; they skirmished ahead of advancing columns." At the end of May 1900, led by Major-General Hamilton, they assaulted the ridge at Doornkop, though Guinness was wounded immediately after the battle at Witpoort. For his war effort, he was Mentioned in Despatches, received the honorary rank of captain in the army, and was awarded the Queen's South Africa Medal with four clasps. Following the war, he was promoted to the substantive rank of lieutenant in the Suffolk Imperial Yeomanry (the Duke of York's Own Loyal Suffolk Hussars) on 12 March 1902, and promoted to the substantive rank of captain the next month, on 5 April 1902, followed by promotion to major on 21 February 1903.

During World War I, he served with distinction in the Suffolk Yeomanry in Egypt, and at Gallipoli. He was appointed a brigade major in the 25th division in 1916. In the fighting around Passchendaele, he was awarded the DSO in 1917, and a bar to it in 1918 during the German spring offensive, for personal bravery, which was rare for an elected politician. He ended the war as a lieutenant-colonel attached to the 66th division. His laconic war diaries were published in 1987, edited by Professor Brian Bond.

== Political career ==
In the 1906 general election as a Conservative candidate, he unsuccessfully contested Stowmarket, a constituency in which he had a family estate. A year later, in 1907, Guinness was elected to the London County Council on which he sat until 1910 and also, at a 1907 by-election, to the House of Commons as Conservative member for Bury St Edmunds, which he continued to represent until 1931. He took the conservative line on Home Rule for Ireland, suffragism and reform of the House of Lords. In 1912, the editor of the magazine Guinness owned, The Outlook, broke the Marconi scandal, accusing Lloyd George and other Liberal ministers of share frauds. Other publications developed the story, but it could not be proven even after lengthy debate. When his role was debated, Guinness explained that he was on safari in Africa at the start, and that his editor's target was inefficiency, not corruption. He visited eastern Anatolia in 1913 and reported that Armenians were being armed secretly by Russia.

World War I reduced Guinness's attendances and opponents accused him of cowardice for being in the House at all. In a heated Armistice speech, he insisted that Germany pay full war reparations, that no ties be made with Russian Bolshevism, and that "Since the days of Mahomet no prophet has been listened to with more superstitious respect than has President Wilson" (of the USA). Irish political developments after 1916 were a concern as the Guinness business was in Dublin. During the Easter Rebellion the brewery first-aid teams helped both sides. The Guinness family was opposed to the rebels, who hailed the Central Powers as "gallant allies." This attitude had to change, and by the time of the Treaty debates in 1922 which established the Irish Free State, he said he preferred "a slippery slope to a precipice" and voted in favour. Despite their politics, during the Irish War of Independence and the Irish Civil War his family was popular enough to escape loss or injury. In 1922, the Chanak crisis caused the coalition Prime Minister Lloyd George to step down unexpectedly in favour of Bonar Law. Guinness's comments on Turkey were a part of the debate; he had come to admire Atatürk, despite serving at Gallipoli and he was appointed Under-Secretary of State for War under Lord Derby. Thereafter, his pronouncements appear less dogmatic. He lost office when a Labour government came to power in January 1924, but the following month, Guinness was sworn of the Privy Council.

Though they had generally been political opponents in 1907–21, Guinness's working political relationship with Winston Churchill started after the Conservative election victory in October 1924, when he was made Financial Secretary under Churchill, the new Chancellor. His ties to Churchill were also strengthened through "The Other Club," an informal dining club for politicians in London that Churchill had founded in 1911 and that Moyne later joined. A rule was that members had to freely express their opinions.

A ministerial vacancy enabled him to join the Cabinet as Minister of Agriculture from November 1925 until June 1929, where his main success was in increasing the sugar beet area. The first beet processing factory was built in his constituency, partly on the advice of Martin Neumann (a grandfather of Stephen Fry), who became a manager there.

After the Conservative defeat in 1929, he had to retire from office. He did not stand for re-election in the 1931 election and was created Baron Moyne, of Bury St Edmunds in the County of Suffolk on 21 January 1932.

In 1930, Moyne and Churchill agreed that the government policies of dropping the Pound sterling off the gold standard and de-rating to cope with the Great Depression were inadequate, along with proposals for dominion status for India. Together, they put the Pound sterling back on the gold standard; a point of pride, but not a policy that lasted for long. When the 1931 coalition government was formed, their criticisms meant that as former ministers they were now out in the political cold.

From 1934, they also warned about Hitler's rise to power and German rearmament. Moyne was in The Other Club on 29 September 1938 when the bad news came of Prime Minister Neville Chamberlain's capitulation to Hitler at Munich. Also present were Brendan Bracken, Lloyd George, Bob Boothby, Duff Cooper, J.L. Garvin, editor of The Observer, and Walter Elliot. "Winston ranted and raved, venting his spleen on the two government ministers present and demanding to know how they could support a policy that was 'sordid, squalid, sub-human and suicidal.'" At that time, they still shared the minority view in parliament; the majority agreed with Moyne's cousin-in-law 'Chips' Channon MP, who recorded about the Munich that "the whole world rejoices whilst only a few malcontents jeer."

On 11 September 1938, just before the Munich crisis, Churchill wrote an oft-repeated comment in a letter to Moyne: "Owing to the neglect of our defences and the mishandling of the German problem in the last five years, we seem to be very near the bleak choice between War and Shame. My feeling is that we shall choose Shame, and then have War thrown in a little later, on even more adverse terms than at present."

=== Later political career ===
Even though an elevation to the Lords ends many political lives, Moyne spent part of 1932 in the colony of Kenya overseeing its finances. In 1933, he chaired a parliamentary committee supervising English slum clearances, in light of his experience gained in his family's charitable trusts mentioned above. In 1934, he joined the Royal Commission examining Durham University, as well as a 1936 committee investigating the British film industry.

In 1938, Moyne was appointed chairman of the West Indies Royal Commission, which was asked to investigate how best the British colonies in the Caribbean should be governed, after labour unrest. The Report and notes were published in 1939 and are held by the PRO at Kew, London. Just before he returned from the Caribbean, his wife Evelyn died on 21 July 1939.

From the outbreak of the Second World War in 1939, Moyne sought the internment of Diana Mosley, his former daughter-in-law, who had left his son Bryan in 1932. She had remarried in 1936 in Berlin to the British fascist leader Sir Oswald Mosley, with Hitler and Goebbels as witnesses. File No KV 2/1363 at the PRO, Kew is part of a collection released in 2004 on British right-wing extremists. The PRO's on-line archivist notes that "Diana Mosley was not interned on the outbreak of war, and remained at liberty for some time. There is a Home Office letter of May 1940 explaining the Home Secretary's decision not to intern her at that time, and then correspondence from her former father-in-law, Lord Moyne, which seems to have resulted in her detention the following month." Moyne's friend Churchill had become prime minister on 10 May 1940. Moyne's last letter, dated 26 June 1940, is quoted in Anne de Courcy's book on Diana Mosley. Later that day her order of detention was signed by J.S. Hale, a principal Secretary of State.

From September 1939, given Hitler's Invasion of Poland (1939), Moyne chaired the Polish Relief Fund in London and gave over his London house at 11 Grosvenor Place, in Belgravia near Buckingham Palace, for the use of Polish officers. From the elevation of Churchill in May 1940, Moyne held several positions in the Churchill war ministry, starting with a Joint Secretaryship in the Ministry of Agriculture. In a cabinet reshuffle in February 1941, he took on his post in the Colonial Office and led the Churchill government's business in the House of Lords, with the honorific title of Leader of the House of Lords.

Largely as a result of his travels and his work in the West Indies, Lord Moyne was appointed Secretary of State for the Colonies by Churchill, serving from 8 February 1941 to 22 February 1942. Moyne was next appointed Deputy Resident Minister of State in Cairo from August 1942 to January 1944 and Minister-Resident for the Middle East from then until his death. Within the British system at that time, this meant control over Persia, the Middle East, including Mandatory Palestine, and Africa. The main task was to ensure the defeat of the Axis forces in North Africa, principally the Afrika Korps led by General Rommel. Another concern was the influence on Arab opinion of the Grand Mufti, a leader of the 1936–1939 Arab revolt in Palestine, who had moved on to Nazi German sanctuary in Berlin in 1941.

== Business and charitable interests ==
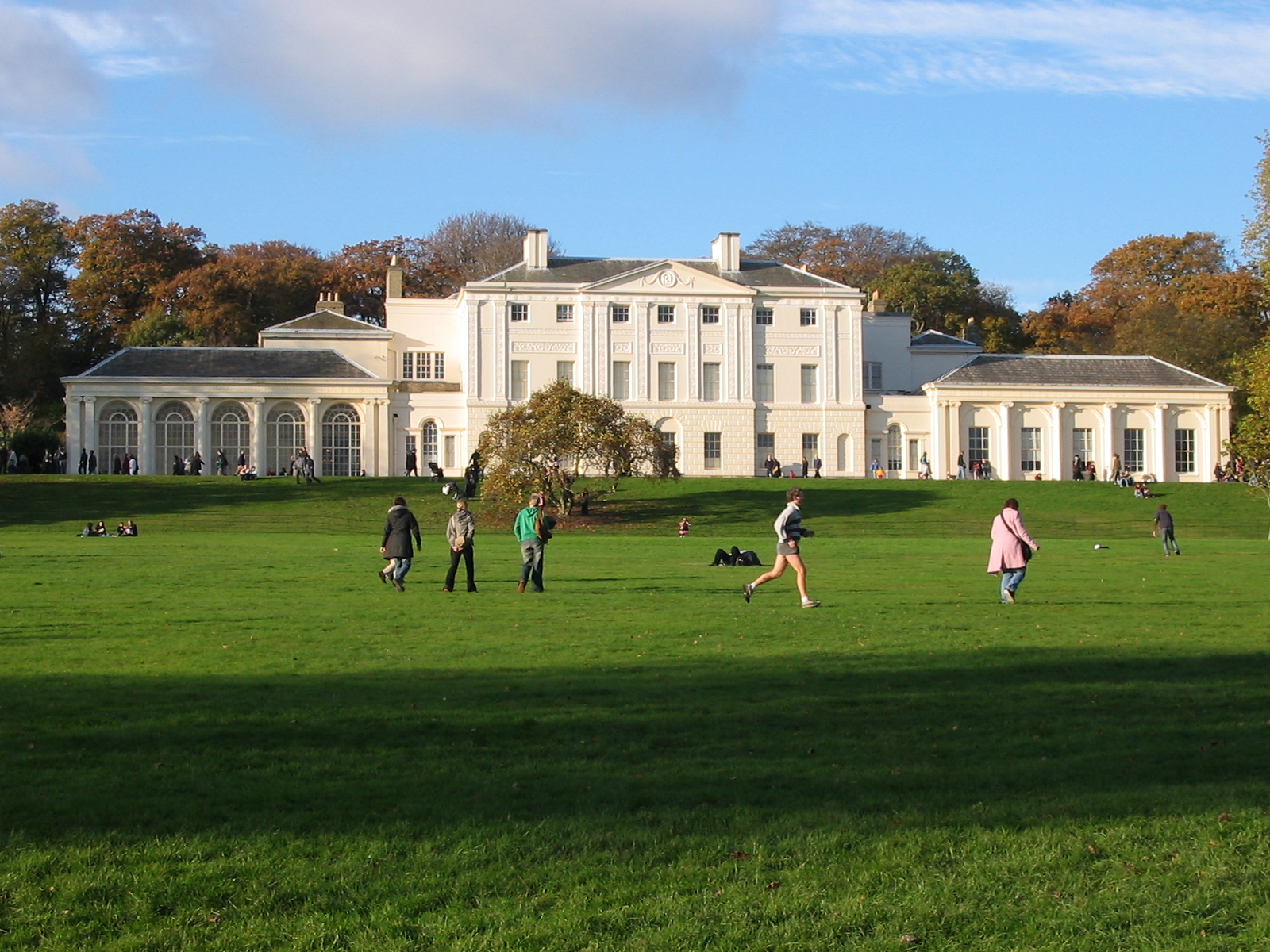
Kenwood House

During his adult life, Moyne was a director of the brewing firm Guinness, established at the St. James's Gate Brewery by his great-great-grandfather Arthur Guinness in 1759. The firm had been listed on the London Stock Exchange in 1886 by his father.

Moyne also established British Pacific Properties in Vancouver, British Columbia, Canada. There he commissioned the Lion's Gate Bridge, then the longest bridge in the British Empire, which was opened by King George VI in 1939.

He was also a trustee of the two charitable housing trusts set up by his father, the Guinness Trust in London (established 1888) and the Iveagh Trust in Dublin (established 1890). In 1927–28, he helped arrange the gift to the nation of Kenwood House which contains his father's art collection.

== Yachts ==
=== Arpha ===
In 1926, Guinness bought the passenger ferry SS Canterbury from the Southern Railway. She was converted to a steam yacht and renamed Arpha. She was sold to Sark Motorships Ltd in 1938.

=== Roussalka ===
In 1931, Guinness bought the passenger ferry SS Brighton from the Southern Railway. She was converted to diesel power and renamed Roussalka. On 25 August 1933, Roussalka was wrecked in Killary Bay but all on board were rescued.

=== Rosaura ===
In September 1933, Moyne purchased the passenger ferry SS Dieppe from the Southern Railway. She was converted to diesel power and renamed Rosaura. He used this boat for social cruises, including a voyage in September 1934 from Marseille on to Greece and Beirut with the Churchills as his guests of honour. From December 1934, he ventured further to the Pacific, with Clementine Churchill as a guest, and brought the first living Komodo dragon back to Britain. He wrote two books about the cultures that he had encountered in thousands of miles of travel around the Pacific, Indian and Atlantic oceans. They are now quite rare: Walkabout; a Journey between the Pacific and Indian oceans (1936) and Atlantic Circle (1938). The Rosaura explains Moyne's closer ties to Winston Churchill, which were to result in his untimely death.

== Moyne, Jews and Palestine ==
=== Views ===
Moyne's views were partly outlined in a speech about the recruitment of Jews into the British Army in the House of Lords on 9 June 1942. Moyne said that:

The Government have already explained what has been done to arm the Jews for the legitimate purpose of self-defence, and we shall no doubt hear from the noble Lord, Lord Croft, to-day how that process has continued in the last few weeks; but is it not clear that Lord Melchett and the responsible leaders of the Jews in this country generally seek to be saved from Lord Wedgwood in his attempt to make political capital out of the natural desire of the Jews to do their utmost to defend the cause of freedom against Nazi tyranny?

However, he opposed the establishment of specifically Jewish army units in the Middle East, "partly to avoid offending Arab sensibilities."

In regard to the problems of the settlement, Moyne said:

It must surely have a deplorable effect upon our Allies to be told by an ex-Cabinet Minister that the Palestine Administration do not like Jews, and that there are enough anti-Semites in Great Britain to back up the Hitler policy and spirit. This suggestion is a complete reversal of the truth. If a comparison is to be made with the Nazis, it is surely those who wish to force an imported régime upon the Arab population who are guilty of the spirit of aggression and domination. Lord Wedgwood's proposal that Arabs should be subjugated by force to a Jewish régime is inconsistent with the Atlantic Charter, and that ought to be told to America. The second principle of that Charter lays down that the United States and ourselves desire to see no territorial changes that do not accord with the freely expressed wishes of the peoples concerned; and the third principle lays down that they respect the right of all peoples to choose the form of Government under which they will live.

British policy in 1944 on immigration followed the White Paper of 1939. Charges against Moyne, amplified by Lehi propaganda, included that Moyne was hostile to Jewish settlement in Palestine due to his support of an Arab federation in the Middle East and that he had made speeches containing antisemitic language, including one in the House of Lords where he suggested that Arabs should get sovereignty over Palestine as the Arab race was "purer" than the "mixed" Jewish race. However, according to historian Bernard Wasserstein, this charge is false. Moyne believed in a federation of Palestine, Transjordan, Lebanon, and Syria, but only conditional on the creation of a Jewish state. Of racial purity, Wasserstein wrote, "In fact, Moyne's speech, when placed in the context of his known views on matters of race can be shown to contradict this interpretation totally." Moyne, an amateur anthropologist, believed that racially intermixed groups were more advanced than the "primitive" racially pure groups like the natives of New Guinea.

=== Palestine partition proposals ===
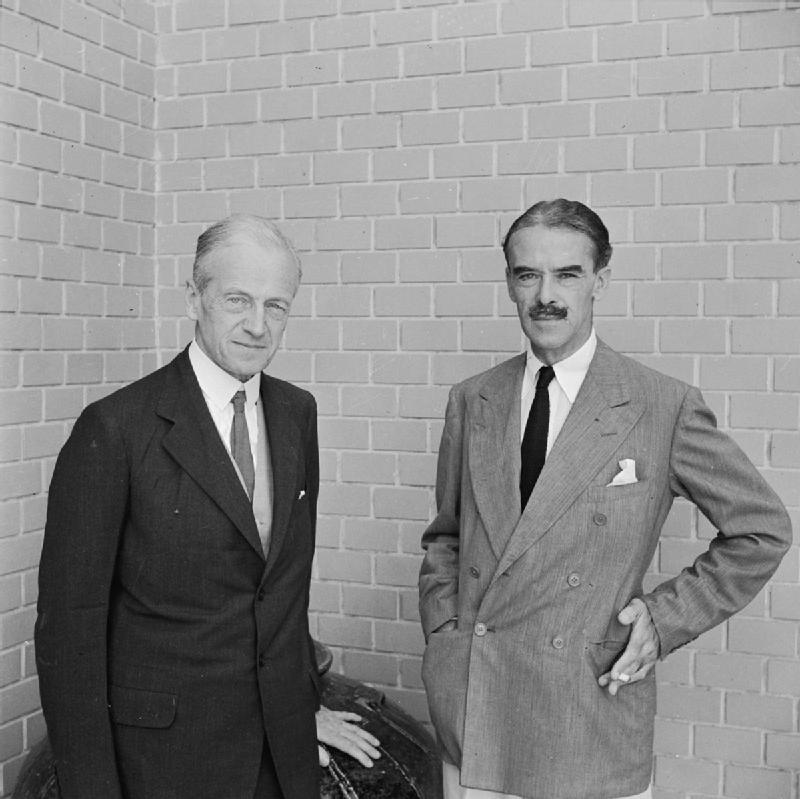
Lord Moyne with his predecessor as Resident Minister in the Middle East, Richard Casey

In November 1943, a committee of the British Cabinet had proposed a partition of Palestine after the war, based loosely on the 1937 Peel Commission proposal. The plan included a Jewish state, a small residual mandatory area under British control, and an Arab state to be joined in a large Arab federation of Greater Syria. The Cabinet approved the plan in principle in January 1944, but it faced severe opposition from the Foreign Secretary Anthony Eden among others. "Moyne's position differed from that of nearly all the British civil and military officials in the Middle East: the consensus of British official opinion in the area opposed partition and opposed a Jewish state; Moyne supported both." The partition plan was before the Cabinet for final approval in the same week that Moyne was assassinated.

=== "Blood for trucks" proposal ===
An anecdote, often cited by Lehi apologists in defense of Moyne's assassination, but dismissed by Bruce Hoffman as a canard, holds that Moyne was personally responsible for the deaths of a million Hungarian Jews.

Joel Brand, a member of the Jewish-Hungarian Aid and Rescue Committee, approached the British in April 1944 with a proposal from Adolf Eichmann, the SS officer in charge of deporting Hungary's Jews to Auschwitz. Eichmann's so-called "blood for trucks" (Blut Für Ware; literally "blood for goods") proposal was that the Nazis would release up to one million Jews in exchange for 10,000 trucks and other goods from the Western Allies.

Brand was arrested and taken to Cairo, where he was questioned for several months. Brand reported that during one of the interrogations, an Englishman he did not know had asked him about Eichmann's proposal, then replied "What can I do with a million Jews? Where can I put them?". On leaving the room, Brand reported, his military escort had told him that the man who had made that remark was Lord Moyne. Brand then added: "I later learnt that Lord Moyne had often deplored the tragic fate of the Jews. The policy which he had to follow, however, was one dictated by a cold and impersonal administration in London. It may be that he paid with his life for the guilt of others."

Brand told this story to the Kastner libel trial in 1953, but in his autobiography published in 1956, he added a caveat "I afterwards heard that the man with whom I spoke was not, in fact, Lord Moyne, but another British statesman. Unfortunately, I have no means of verifying this." Brand later testified in the Eichmann trial in 1961 that it was Moyne who said "What shall I do with those million Jews?" The story of the remark, attributed to Moyne, is regularly quoted by historians. Historian Bernard Wasserstein believes that "the truth is that Brand almost certainly never met Moyne". This is supported by Shlomo Aronson, who traces the remark to a comment made by the head of the Refugee Section of the Foreign Office, Alec Randall, which was later repeated by Moshe Shertok at a meeting which Brand attended.

During Brand's incarceration, both Brand and Moyne were interviewed by Ira Hirschmann, who had been appointed by Roosevelt as the War Refugee Board delegate in Turkey. According to Hirschmann, Moyne suggested sending Brand back to Hungary with a noncommittal reply that would enable the Jews there to continue talks. Moyne also supported a proposal to offer money to the Germans instead of trucks. However, the British government did not adopt either proposal.

The Western Allies, while skeptical of the offer, at first seriously considered discussing the offer with the Germans, but changed their minds when their intelligence investigations concluded that it was a German trap to embarrass the US government and damage the alliance with the Soviets. The British released Brand in October 1944, about one month before Moyne's assassination, after which he joined the group Lehi which would commit the assassination.

Two months before his death in 1964, Brand commented: "I made a terrible mistake in passing this on to the British. It is now clear to me that Himmler sought to sow suspicion among the Allies as a preparation for his much-desired Nazi-Western coalition against Moscow."

== Assassination ==
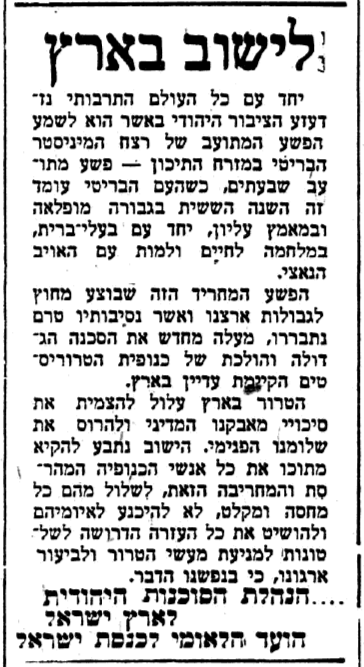
Condemnation of the assassination by official Jewish organizations

In the early afternoon of 6 November 1944, Eliyahu Bet-Zuri and Eliyahu Hakim of the Jewish terrorist group Lehi waited for Moyne near his home in Cairo following a well-planned and much practised plan of action to assassinate Moyne.

Moyne arrived in his car with his driver, Lance Corporal Arthur Fuller, his secretary, Dorothy Osmond, and his ADC, Major Andrew Hughes-Onslow. The ADC went to open the front door of the residence and the driver got out to open the door for Moyne. They were suddenly told not to move, as Bet-Zuri emerged and shot Fuller in the chest, causing him to collapse in the driveway and bleed to death in minutes. Hakim then pulled the car door open and shot Moyne three times. The first bullet hit him in the neck on the right side, just above the clavicle, the second penetrated his abdomen, punctured his colon and large intestine, and became embedded to the right of the second lumbar vertebrae, while the third shot, fired after Moyne raised his right hand, ripped across four of his fingers and went in and out of his chest, causing no serious injuries.

Hakim and Bet-Zuri ran out of the yard, jumped on their rented bicycles, and began pedalling down the street away from the scene. Major Hughes-Onslow rushed to the sentry box and raised the alarm. Hearing it, Hakim and Bet-Zuri turned onto a side street. They had very nearly gotten away when an Egyptian motorcycle policeman, El-Amin Mahomed Abdullah, caught up to them. Bet-Zuri fired a volley of warning shots in his direction, which he ignored. Abdullah then dismounted and ordered him to drop his weapon. Bet-Zuri attempted to shoot out the motorcycle's tires but found that his pistol had run out of ammunition, and as he attempted to reload it, Abdullah fired, hitting Bet-Zuri in the chest. Hearing the commotion, Hakim turned back to help Bet-Zuri, and within minutes, another policeman appeared, and the two were placed under arrest.

Meanwhile, Moyne regained consciousness, and in a few minutes, a doctor and ambulance arrived. Moyne was rushed to a British military hospital in Cairo and admitted at 1:40 p.m., in critical condition, having lost a great deal of blood through gross haemorrhaging and suffering from shock. Five minutes later, he was given the first of three blood transfusions, causing his condition to improve. After he complained of a burning sensation down his right leg and an inability to move it, X-rays revealed an injury to his thoracic vertebrae. Later, his right arm also became paralyzed as a result of the neck wound. Doctors were reluctant to operate until his condition improved, but at 5:30, a lumbar puncture revealed a bloodstain, and it was decided to operate. He was given another blood transfusion, and in the operation that followed, surgeons removed the bullet lodged near the second lumbar vertebra and discovered the injuries to the colon and large intestine, while the neck wound and finger wounds were cleaned. Soon after the operation, his condition began to deteriorate, and he died at 8:40 pm, aged 64.

As the principal witness at the trial, Major Hughes-Onslow became a marked man and was sent to Aden and then to Khartoum for his safety. He subsequently said, "No doubt Lord Moyne could have been regarded as a target for political assassination, but the shooting of the chauffeur was pure murder."

Moyne's body was flown home to England and cremated on 17 November at Golders Green Crematorium. His will was proven on 2 December, with his estate valued at £2 million (equivalent to £76,681,040 in 2025).

According to a member of the Lehi's three-man executive, Natan Yellin-Mor, the group's founder Ya'ir Stern had considered the possibility of assassinating the British Minister Resident in the Middle East as early as 1941 before Moyne held the position. Moyne's predecessor Richard Casey was deemed unsuitable because he was Australian. When Moyne replaced Casey in 1944, planning for the operation began.

As well as being the highest British official within Lehi's reach, Moyne was regarded as personally responsible for Britain's Palestine policy. In particular, he was regarded as one of the architects of Britain's strict immigration policy, and to have been responsible for the British hand in the Struma disaster, which followed a refusal to grant visas to Palestine for its Jewish refugee passengers, decided during his time as Colonial Secretary. According to Bell, Lord Moyne was believed by the underground to be an Arabist, who had consistently followed an anti-Zionist line.

However, according to Yellin-Mor:

"Really these acts by Lord Moyne were without meaning for us. They were useful only as propaganda, because they allowed us to explain to the people why we had killed him. What was important to us was that he symbolized the British Empire in Cairo. We weren't yet in a position to try to hit Churchill in London, so the logical second best was to hit Lord Moyne in Cairo."

According to Yaakov Banai (Mazal), who served as the commander of the fighting unit of Lehi, there were three purposes in the assassination:

1. To show the world that this conflict was not between a government and its citizens as Britain had tried to show but between citizens and a foreign ruler.
2. To demonstrate that the conflict was between the Jewish people and British Imperialism.
3. To take the "War of Liberation" out of the Land of Israel and the Yishuv. The trial was not planned, but the action had to capture a place in the world press and lead political thoughts.

Author James Barr suggests that a French intelligence initiative was behind Moyne's murder, because of his support for the Greater Syria plan.

=== Trial ===
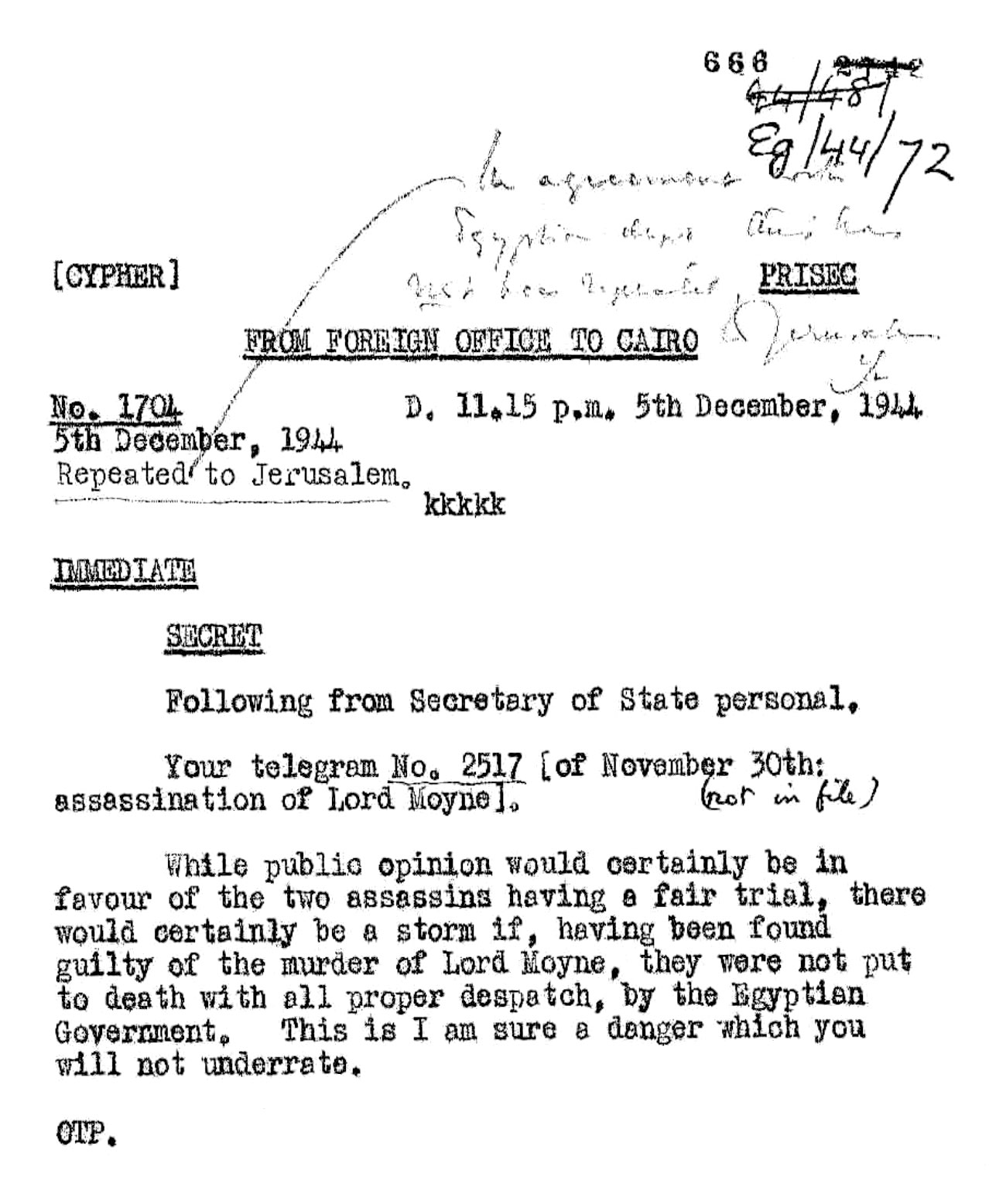
Telegram sent to Cairo regarding the execution of the assassins of Lord Moyne

After the assassination, Lehi announced:

We accuse Lord Moyne and the government he represents, with murdering hundreds and thousands of our brethren; we accuse him of seizing our country and looting our possessions. We were forced to do justice and to fight.

Bet-Zuri and Hakim initially gave false names, but their true identities were soon discovered. They were tried by an Egyptian military court. Both men were found guilty and, on 18 January 1945, sentenced to death. Their appeals for clemency were dismissed, probably partly in response to pressure from Winston Churchill, who had been Moyne's ally and close personal friend. They were hanged on 23 March 1945.

== Aftermath ==
Although the group had been targeting British Mandate personnel since 1940, Moyne was the first high-profile British official to be killed by them, though several failed attempts had been made to assassinate the British High Commissioner in Palestine, Sir Harold MacMichael. This was therefore the opening shot in the new Lehi campaign.

Jewish authorities in Palestine, fearful of British retribution, were quick to distance themselves from Lehi actions. On the news of Moyne's death, Chaim Weizmann, who later became the first President of Israel, is reported to have said that the death was more painful to him than that of his own son.

British prime minister Winston Churchill, who once described himself as a "Zionist," taking the view that the creation of a Jewish state in Palestine would provide Britain with a more reliable and powerful ally, for the time-being tempered his support for Zionism. Moyne had been sent to Cairo because of their long personal and political friendship, and Churchill told the House of Commons:

If our dreams for Zionism are to end in the smoke of assassins' pistols and our labours for its future to produce only a new set of gangsters worthy of Nazi Germany, many like myself will have to reconsider the position we have maintained so consistently and so long in the past. If there is to be any hope of a peaceful and successful future for Zionism, these wicked activities must cease, and those responsible for them must be destroyed root and branch. [...] In Palestine the executive of the Jewish Agency have called upon the Jewish community—and I quote their actual words: 'To cast out the members of this destructive band, deprive them of all refuge and shelter, to resist their threats, and to render all necessary assistance to the authorities in the prevention of terrorist acts, and in the eradication of the terrorist organisation.' These are strong words, but we must wait for these words to be translated into deeds.

Referring to Lord Moyne, he also added, "I can assure the House that the Jews in Palestine have rarely lost a better or more well-informed friend."

Moyne's parliamentary friend and cousin in law, Henry 'Chips' Channon M.P. wrote in his diary:

I went to sleep last night with strange emotions. Walter Moyne was an extraordinary man, colossally rich, well-meaning, intelligent, scrupulous, yet a viveur, and the only modern Guinness to play a social or political role.... He was careful with his huge fortune, though he had probably about three millions.

The Times of London quoted Ha'aretz's view that the assassins "have done more by this single reprehensible crime to demolish the edifice erected by three generations of Jewish pioneers than is imaginable." The assassination caused the Palestine partition proposals that were awaiting final approval in Cabinet to be immediately shelved and never resurrected. Moyne's successor in Cairo, Sir Edward Grigg, was opposed to partition. Some historians, such as Wasserstein and Porath, have speculated that a Jewish state soon after the war had been a real possibility.

The historian Brenner writes that the purpose of the attack on Moyne was also in order to show the efficacy of armed resistance and to demonstrate to the British that they were not safe in any place as long as they remained in Palestine. The assassination also seemed to affect the Arab side, particularly in stimulating Egyptian nationalism. Brenner makes a comparison between Moyne's death and the assassination of pro-British Ahmad Mahir Pasha. There were Lehi members who advocated the formation of a "Semitic Bloc" opposing foreign domination, and this made it possible for Arabs to actually join Lehi.

In 1975, Egypt returned the bodies of Ben Zuri and Hakim to Israel in exchange for 20 prisoners from Gaza and Sinai. They were laid in state in the Jerusalem Hall of Heroism, where they were attended by many dignitaries, including Prime Minister Yitzhak Rabin and President Ephraim Katzir. Then they were buried in the military section of Mount Herzl in a state funeral with full military honours. Britain lodged a formal protest, but Israel rejected the criticism, referring to Ben Zuri and Hakim as "heroic freedom fighters." In 1982, postage stamps were issued in their honour.

The two pistols used in the assassination were later found to have been used in eight previous murders.

== Miscellaneous ==
Lord Moyne's large collection of archeological and ethnographic artefacts was acquired by the British Museum in London and the Museum of Archeology and Anthropology in Cambridge.

== References (books) ==
- Bauer, Yehuda (1978). The Holocaust in Historical Perspective. Canberra: Australian National University Press. ISBN 0708110673.
- Bauer, Yehuda (1994). Jews for Sale?. New Haven: Yale University Press. ISBN 0-300-05913-2.
- Ben-Yehuda, Nachman (1993). Political assassinations by Jews: a rhetorical device for justice. Albany: SUNY Press. ISBN 0-585-09119-6.
- Guinness (1st Baron Moyne), Walter Edward; Haddon, Alfred Cort; Cave, Alexander James Edward (1936). Walkabout: A Journey Between the Pacific and Indian Oceans. London: W. Heinemann Ltd. OCLC 5351894.
- Guinness (1st Baron Moyne), Walter Edward (1938). Atlantic Circle. Glasgow: Blackie & Son. OCLC 5509205.
- Guinness (1st Baron Moyne), Walter Edward; Bond, Brian; Robbins, Simon (1987). Staff Officer: The Diaries of Walter Guinness (First Lord Moyne), 1914–1918. London: L. Cooper. ISBN 0-85052-053-3.
- Wilson, Derek A. (1998). Dark and Light: The Story of the Guinness Family. London: Weidenfeld & Nicolson. ISBN 0-297-81718-3.

== References (journals) ==
- Wasserstein, Bernard (1979). "The assassination of Lord Moyne". The Jewish Historical Society of England – Transactions & Miscellanies. 27: 72–83.
- Wasserstein, Bernard (1980). "New light on the Moyne murder". Midstream. 26: 30–38.

== References (web) ==
- Brodie, Marc rev. (May 2006). "Guinness, Walter Edward, first Baron Moyne (1880–1944)". Oxford Dictionary of National Biography (online ed.). Oxford University Press. doi:10.1093/ref:odnb/33605. (Subscription, Wikipedia Library access or UK public library membership required.)
- Canadian Parliament, 1st Session, 38th Parliament, Issue 13 (2004). "Inquires (Canadian parliamentary statement on the sixtieth anniversary of the assassination of Walter Edward Guinness, Lord Moyne)". Journals of the Senate.
- "Featured Books for "Moyne Commission"". Amazon.
- Guinness, W.E. (1938–1945). "Moyne papers on West India Royal Commission". AIM25: Institute of Commonwealth Studies. GB 0101 ICS 56. Archived from the original on 29 May 2008.
- Guyana News and Information. "Moyne Commission". guyana.org.
- Trinity College Dublin. "Moyne Institute of Preventative Medicine, designed by Desmond Fitzgerald, opened in 1953, home to the Department of Microbiology". tcd.ie.

Parliament of the United Kingdom
Preceded by Frederick William Fane Hervey	Member for Bury St Edmunds; 1907–1931	Succeeded by Frank Heilgers
Political offices
Preceded by Sir William Joynson-Hicks	Financial Secretary to the Treasury; 1923–1924	Succeeded by William Graham
Preceded by William Graham	Financial Secretary to the Treasury; 1924–1925	Succeeded by Ronald McNeill
Preceded by E.F.L. Wood	Minister of Agriculture and Fisheries; 1925–1929	Succeeded by Noel Buxton
Preceded by The Lord Lloyd	Secretary of State for the Colonies; 1941–1942	Succeeded by Viscount Cranborne
Preceded by The Lord Lloyd	Leader of the House of Lords; 1941–1942	Succeeded by Viscount Cranborne
Party political offices
Preceded by The Lord Lloyd	Leader of the Conservative Party in the House of Lords; 1941–1942	Succeeded by Viscount Cranborne
Peerage of the United Kingdom
New title	Baron Moyne; 1932–1944	Succeeded by Bryan Guinness
