= Desmond Guinness =

Irish architectural historian and conservationist (1931–2020)

The Honourable Desmond Guinness
- Born: 8 September 1931; London, England
- Died: 20 August 2020 (aged 88); Leixlip, County Kildare, Ireland
- Education: Eton College
- Alma mater: Christ Church, Oxford
- Occupations: Historian, heritage campaigner
- Spouses: Princess Henriette Marie-Gabrielle von Urach; Penelope Cuthbertson
- Children: Patrick Desmond Carl-Alexander; Marina Guinness
- Parent(s): Bryan Guinness, 2nd Baron Moyne; Diana Mitford
- Relatives: Jonathan Guinness, 3rd Baron Moyne (brother); Max Mosley (maternal half-brother)

Desmond Walter Guinness (8 September 1931 – 20 August 2020) was an Anglo-Irish author of Georgian art and architecture, a conservationist and the co-founder of the Irish Georgian Society. He was the second son of the author and brewer Bryan Guinness, 2nd Baron Moyne, and his then wife Diana Mitford (later Lady Mosley).

In 1958, he bought Leixlip Castle, Leixlip, County Kildare, Ireland, where he lived with both his first wife, Princess Henriette Marie-Gabrielle von Urach, generally known as Mariga, and later his second wife, the former Penelope Cuthbertson, whom he married in 1984.

== Life ==
=== Early life and marriage ===
Born on 8 September 1931, Guinness was the second son of the author Bryan Guinness and Diana Mitford; his elder brother was Jonathan. Bryan succeeded as the 2nd Baron Moyne in November 1944. Desmond's mother divorced the then Bryan Guinness after five years and married the head of the British fascist Blackshirt movement, Oswald Mosley, in Berlin in 1936. Due to Mitford's interest in fascism, her father-in-law the 1st Baron had arranged for surveillance from 1935 onward, including by one of Guinness's governesses, and MI5 even noted a plan for her to visit Hitler with her sons. Mitford was interned in 1940, and Guinness later recalled visiting her in Holloway Prison when he was 10.

He was educated at Eton and Gordonstoun, and studied French and Italian at Christ Church, Oxford. After completing National Service, he moved to the estate of Lord Moyne, his father, near the Phoenix Park in Dublin, as Lord Moyne lived for six months a year in Ireland, and his mother had also moved to Ireland with Mosley, first living in Clonfert, then in Fermoy.

Guinness was married at Oxford in 1954 to Princess Henriette Marie-Gabrielle von Urach, daughter of Fürst Albrecht von Urach and a granddaughter of King Mindaugas II of Lithuania, who was generally known as "Mariga". Guinness bought Leixlip Castle and its residual 180-acre farm for £15,500, one third of his assets, in 1958, and he and his wife settled there.

Mariga Guinness moved to London alone in 1969, later lived in County Antrim, and later still returned to Leixlip Castle. The Guinnesses divorced in 1980, and Mariga died some years later.

=== Irish Georgian Society ===
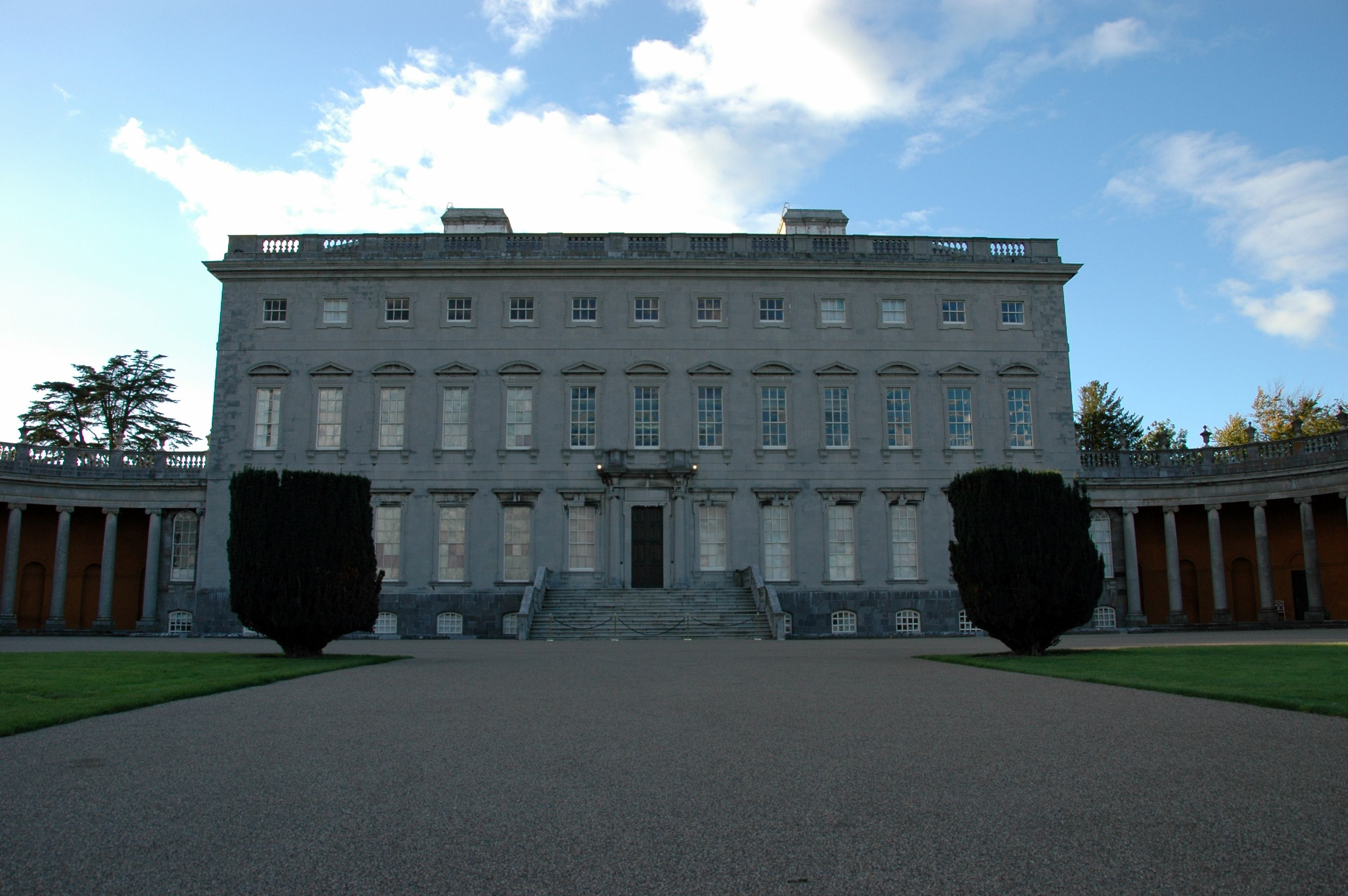
Castletown house

Desmond and Mariga founded the Irish Georgian Society in April 1958 to help to preserve Irish architecture of all periods. This was timely as the Irish planning laws were enacted only from 1963.

The IGS became involved in numerous projects and started publishing quarterly bulletins. Some early preservations or campaigns were at: Damer House (County Tipperary), The Conolly Folly (County Kildare), Mountjoy Square, Tailors' Hall and Hume Street (Dublin) and the Dromana Gateway in County Waterford.

The IGS also held Georgian cricket matches played to the rules of 1744.

Between 1967 and 1979 the Guinnesses bought and started to preserve Castletown House, in Celbridge, Kildare, said to be the finest Palladian house in Ireland.

=== Other philanthropic and social activities ===
He was a member of Irish groups such as the Iveagh Trust, the CKAS, the RIAC and the Kildare Street & University Club.

=== Later life ===
In 1984, Guinness married Penelope Cuthbertson, daughter of the socialite Teresa Jungman, and a granddaughter of the artist Nico Wilhelm Jungmann.

In more recent years, Guinness founded a scholarship for students of architecture.

He was Master of the North Kildare Harriers. He stood down as President of the IGS in 1990.

Guinness died on 20 August 2020, at the age of 88.

== Family ==
The Guinnesses had a son, Patrick Desmond Carl-Alexander, and a daughter, Marina. Through Patrick he was a grandfather of the fashion model Jasmine Guinness. His daughter Marina is a patron of the arts and of Irish musicians including Glen Hansard, Damien Rice, and the band Kíla. Marina has three children of her own: Patrick (by Stewart Copeland of The Police), Violet (by photographer Perry Ogden), and Finbar (by record producer Denny Cordell).

There are no children from his second marriage.

His brother is Jonathan Guinness, 3rd Baron Moyne. He was the older half-brother (on his mother's side) of Max Mosley, former President of the FIA.

== Recognition ==
His conservation work has been recognised by many American and English cultural groups, and Europa Nostra. In 1980 he was made an honorary Doctor of Laws at Trinity College Dublin. In 2001 he was made an honorary member of the Royal Institute of the Architects of Ireland and was awarded the gold medal of the Eire Society of Boston. He was a member of the Society of Dilettanti in London. In 2006 he was presented with a Europa Nostra award by the Queen of Spain. In 2010 he headed the Saint Patrick's Day parade in Seattle. In June 2014 he was awarded honorary lifetime membership of the Royal Dublin Society.

== Publications ==
=== Books ===
Guinness wrote the following books:

- Portrait of Dublin (New York: Viking Press, 1967)
- Georgian Dublin (Batsford, B.T., Ltd. 1979) ISBN 978-0-7134-1908-5

three further books with Julius Trousdale Sadler:

- Mr Jefferson, architect (New York: Viking, 1973) ISBN 978-0-670-49261-9
- Palladio: A Western Progress (New York: 1976) ISBN 978-0-670-53732-7
- Newport preserv'd : architecture of the 18th century (New York: Viking Press, 1982) ISBN 978-0-670-50938-6

two with William Ryan:

- Irish Houses and Castles; with William Ryan. (London: Thames & Hudson, 1973).
- The White House: An Architectural History (New York: McGraw-Hill, 1980). ISBN 978-0-07-054352-2

and two with Jacqueline O'Brien, wife of the famous racehorse trainer Vincent O'Brien:

- Dublin – A Grand Tour (Weidenfeld & Nicolson, 1994)
- Great Irish Houses and Castles (Harry N. Abrams, Inc.) ISBN 978-0-8109-3365-1 (December 1998) and in paperback (Weidenfeld & Nicolson, September 1993) ISBN 978-0-297-83236-2.

=== Articles ===
Guinness wrote numerous articles, including Thomas Jefferson: Visionary Architect. Horizon, 22 (1979): 51–55.
