= Jonathan Guinness, 3rd Baron Moyne =

British peer and businessman (1930–2026)

The Right Honourable The Lord Moyne
- The Lord Moyne in 1997

Member of the House of Lords
- Lord Temporal
- In office 6 July 1992 – 11 November 1999 as a hereditary peer
- Preceded by: The 2nd Baron Moyne
- Succeeded by: Seat abolished (Note: Pursuant to the House of Lords Act 1999.)

Personal details
- Born: Jonathan Bryan Guinness; 16 March 1930 London, England
- Died: 30 October 2026 (aged 96)
- Spouse(s): Ingrid Wyndham (m. 1951; div. 1963) Suzanne Lisney (m. 1964; died 2005)
- Domestic partner: Susan Taylor
- Children: 8, including Catherine and Daphne
- Parent(s): Bryan Guinness, 2nd Baron Moyne; Hon. Diana Freeman-Mitford

Jonathan Bryan Guinness, 3rd Baron Moyne (16 March 1930 – 30 October 2026) was a British peer, businessman and writer. A member of the Guinness family, he was the elder of the two sons of Bryan Guinness, 2nd Baron Moyne, and his first wife Diana Mitford (later Lady Mosley). Until his retirement, he was a non-executive director of Guinness plc, and a merchant banker with Messrs Leopold Joseph.

== Early life ==
Guinness was educated at Eton College and the University of Oxford. He worked as a journalist and then as a merchant banker. From 1970 to 1974 he was a member of Leicestershire County Council.

== Conservative Party ==
Guinness twice stood unsuccessfully as a parliamentary candidate for the Conservative Party: At the 1973 Lincoln by-election (notable for the election of Dick Taverne), where he finished third with 6,616 votes (17.5%); and the 1976 Coventry North West by-election, where he came second behind Labour's Geoffrey Robinson with 13,424 votes (37.4%).

== Monday Club ==
Guinness was a long-standing and early member (1968) of the Conservative Monday Club, serving on several of its committees. He was a member of the club's executive council in 1971, when he became chairman of their 'Action Fund'. In the spring 1972 edition of Monday World he contributed an article titled "The Club Today – Opportunities and Growing Pains". He was subsequently elected national chairman on 5 June following, fighting off challenges from Richard Body and Timothy Stroud.

The Guardian and The Times referred to his election as "a right-wing victory". At the club's annual general meeting in April 1973 Guinness retained the chairmanship for another year, defeating George Kennedy Young by 30 percent of the vote. In mid-1974 he was invited to address conservative students at Portsmouth Polytechnic, but was "prevented from entering by a solid wall of militant protesters hurling abuse". Guinness was a supporter of Rhodesia and, with John Stokes and the Lord Barnby addressed a Monday Club meeting on the issue in 1974 in Caxton Hall.

On 10 October 1989, at the Conservative Party Conference, he chaired a fringe meeting organised by the Young Monday Club, advertised as The End of the English? – Immigration and Repatriation. The other speakers were MPs Tim Janman and Nicholas Budgen.

As chairman of the club's Race Relations & Immigration Committee, he also wrote the same month to all Club members; "There has been a lot of ill-thought out agitation following events in China, urging the government to amend the British Nationality Act so as to give the right of UK residence to more than three million people from Hong Kong who hold British passports. At the time of writing the government has stayed firm on this, but it is under pressure. If you have not already done so, please write to your M.P., your local and national newspapers, or the Prime Minister expressing support for the government's stand. Remember, a passport is not a residence permit, but a travel document; and think of the sheer physical burden of housing and accommodating a sudden influx of this size."

He was also Club Vice-Chairman until late 1990 when he was replaced by the MP Andrew Hunter.

== Trustor ==
In October 1997, Moyne was accused of involvement in a Swedish financial scandal. The case concerned a Swedish investment company, Trustor, of which Lord Moyne was made a figurehead director. It was alleged that Guinness was involved in the disappearance of £50,000,000 from Trustor's accounts, £35,000,000 of which were soon found in Trustor AB's own bank account as they had never left the company. Guinness maintained that he was innocent of any wrongdoing, claiming he was "stitched up". During the proceedings, Swedish authorities were successful in obtaining a freezing order over what little assets he had left. He was found innocent by the Swedish court.

== Support for Falun Gong ==
Moyne spoke in support of the Falun Gong movement in China after it was banned there in 1999, as reported in Hansard.

== Director of Guinness plc ==
Moyne was a non-executive director from 1960 to 1988 of the company set up by his family. His book Requiem for a Family Business gives an uninvolved insider's account of the corporate developments leading to the Guinness share-trading fraud.

== Personal life and death ==
Moyne was married twice and had eight children.

He married firstly in 1951 (marriage dissolved 1963), Ingrid Wyndham; later the wife of his cousin Lord Kelvedon, with issue:

- Hon. Catherine Ingrid Guinness (born 1 June 1952), married firstly James Charteris, 13th Earl of Wemyss, and secondly Robert Hesketh.
- Hon. Jasper Jonathan Richard Guinness (9 March 1954 – 7 May 2011), who was married with two daughters.
- Valentine Guy Bryan Guinness, 4th Baron Moyne (born 9 March 1959).

He married secondly, in 1964, Suzanne Lisney (died 2005), with issue:

- Hon. Sebastian Walter Denis Guinness (born 1964), who has been twice married without issue.
- Hon. Daphne Suzannah Diana Guinness (born 1967), socialite, who married in 1987 (marriage dissolved 1999) Spyros Niarchos (born 1955), by whom she has three children.

By his mistress Susan "Shoe" Taylor (1944–2003), Moyne had three children:

- Diana Guinness (born 1981)
- Aster Guinness (born 1984)
- Thomas Guinness-Taylor (born 1986)

To avert a scandal over the extramarital affair with Taylor, Lord Moyne published Shoe – The Odyssey of a Sixties Survivor in 1989. The Sun newspaper ran a double-page article with pictures entitled Always a Mistress – Never the Bride on 6 July 1989.

Moyne and his daughter Daphne both had letters published in the same edition of The Daily Telegraph (16 August 2003) attacking the writer Andrew Roberts over his criticism in the same newspaper on 13 August 2003 of Jonathan's mother, Lady Mosley, following her death.

His younger brother, Desmond Guinness, died in August 2020. Lord Moyne died on 30 October 2026, aged 96.

== Publications ==
- Guinness, Jonathan, with Jeremy Harwood and John Biggs-Davison, Ireland – Our Cuba?, The Monday Club, London, 1970. (p/b).
- Guinness, Jonathan, Arms for South Africa – the Moral Issue, The Monday Club, London, 1971. (p/b).
- Courtney, Anthony T., (M.P. for Harrow East 1959–1964), The Enemies Within, foreword by the Hon. Jonathan Guinness, The Monday Club, London, 1972. (p/b).
- Guinness, Jonathan, with Catherine Guinness, The House of Mitford, Hutchinson & Co., London, 1984. ISBN 0-7538-1803-5
- Guinness, Jonathan, "Marx, the False Prophet", in Marx Refuted, edited by Ronald Duncan and Colin Wilson, Ashgrove Press Ltd., Bath, (UK), 1987. ISBN 0-906798-71-X
- Guinness, Jonathan, Shoe: The Odyssey of a Sixties Survivor, Hutchinson, London, 1989. ISBN 0-091-73857-1
- Guinness, Jonathan, Requiem for a Family Business, Macmillan, London, 1997. ISBN 0-333-66191-5
- Alexander, Diana, The Other Mitford: Pamela's Story, foreword by Jonathan Guinness, The History Press, 2012. ISBN 0-752-47121-X

== Sources ==
- Copping, Robert, The Story of The Monday Club – The First Decade, April 1972, Current Affairs Information Service, Ilford, Essex.
- Copping, Robert, The Monday Club – Crisis and After May 1975, Current Affairs Information Service, Ilford, Essex.
- Hansard

Party political offices
Preceded by George Pole	Chairman of the Monday Club; June 1972 – March 1974	Succeeded by John Biggs-Davison
Peerage of the United Kingdom
Preceded by Bryan Guinness	Baron Moyne; 1992–2026; Member of the House of Lords (1992–1999)	Succeeded by Valentine Guinness, 4th Baron Moyne
