= Bryan Guinness, 2nd Baron Moyne =

British writer and poet (1905–1992)

The Right Honourable The Lord Moyne FRSL
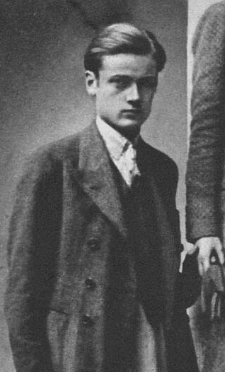
- Guinness in Taormina, 1929

Member of the House of Lords
- Lord Temporal
- In office 6 November 1944 – 6 July 1992
- Preceded by: The 1st Baron Moyne
- Succeeded by: The 3rd Baron Moyne

Personal details
- Born: Bryan Walter Guinness; 27 October 1905 London, England
- Died: 6 July 1992 (aged 86) Biddesden, Wiltshire, England
- Spouses: Hon. Diana Freeman-Mitford (m. 1929; div. 1933); Elisabeth Nelson (m. 1936)
- Children: 11, including Jonathan and Desmond
- Parents: Walter Guinness, 1st Baron Moyne; Lady Evelyn Erskine
- Education: Christ Church, Oxford

Bryan Walter Guinness, 2nd Baron Moyne (27 October 1905 – 6 July 1992), was a British aristocrat, writer, poet and heir to part of the Guinness family brewing fortune. He was vice-chairman of Guinness plc and authored several works of poetry and novels.

== Early life ==
Guinness was the son of Col. the Hon. Walter Guinness (later created Baron Moyne), third son of Edward Guinness, 1st Earl of Iveagh, and his wife, Lady Evelyn Erskine (1883–1939), daughter of Shipley Erskine, 14th Earl of Buchan. He was educated at Heatherdown School, Eton College and Christ Church, Oxford, and was called to the bar in 1931. At Oxford, Guinness was a member of the Railway Club.

A member of the prominent Guinness family, Guinness was an organiser of the 1929 "Bruno Hat" hoax art exhibition held at his home in London.

== Marriages and family ==
In 1929, Guinness married the Hon. Diana Freeman-Mitford, daughter of the 2nd Baron Redesdale and one of the Mitford sisters. They had two sons:

- Jonathan Bryan Guinness, 3rd Baron Moyne (16 March 1930 − 30 October 2026)
- Hon. Desmond Walter Guinness (8 September 1931 – 20 August 2020)

The couple became leaders of the London artistic and social scene and were dedicatees of Evelyn Waugh's second novel Vile Bodies. However, they divorced in 1933 after Diana deserted Guinness for British fascist leader Sir Oswald Mosley.

In 1931, Guinness bought Biddesden House – an 18th-century country house in Wiltshire, near Ludgershall village and the Hampshire town of Andover – together with about 200 acres (81 ha). In 1990, he and his family owned about 600 acres in Ludgershall parish, including Biddesden Farm.

Guinness remarried in 1936 to Elisabeth Nelson (1912–1999), daughter of Thomas Arthur Nelson, of the Nelson publishing family, with whom he had the following children:

- Hon. Rosaleen Elisabeth Guinness (born 7 September 1937)
- Hon. Diarmid Edward Guinness (23 September 1938 – 15 August 1977)
- Hon. Fiona Evelyn Guinness (born 26 June 1940)
- Hon. Dr. Finn Benjamin Guinness (born 26 August 1945)
- Hon. Thomasin Margaret Guinness (born 16 January 1947)
- Hon. Kieran Arthur Guinness (born 11 February 1949)
- Hon. Catriona Rose Guinness (born 13 December 1950)
- Hon. Erskine Stuart Richard Guinness (born 16 January 1953)
- Hon. Mirabel Jane Guinness (born 8 September 1956)

== Public life ==
During World War II, Guinness served for three years in the Middle East with the Spears Mission to the Free French, being a fluent French speaker. He gained the rank of Major in the Royal Sussex Regiment. In November 1944, Guinness succeeded to the barony when his father, posted abroad as Resident Minister in the Middle East by his friend Winston Churchill, was assassinated in Cairo.

After the war, Lord Moyne was on the board of the Guinness corporation as vice-chairman from 1947 to 1979, as well as the Guinness Trust and the Iveagh Trust, and sat as a crossbencher in the House of Lords. He served for 35 years as a trustee of the National Gallery of Ireland and donated several works to the gallery. He wrote a number of critically applauded novels, memoirs, books of poetry, and plays. With Frank Pakenham he sought the return of the "Lane Bequest" to Dublin, resulting in the 1959 compromise agreement. He was invested as a Fellow of the Royal Society of Literature. He served as pro-chancellor of Trinity College Dublin from 1965 to 1977 and was made an honorary fellow in 1977.

== Death ==
Lord Moyne died in 1992 at Biddesden House, his Wiltshire home, and was succeeded by his eldest son from his first marriage, Jonathan Guinness, 3rd Baron Moyne.

== Bibliography ==
- Plays: The Fragrant Concubine, A Tragedy (1938); A Riverside Charade (1954)
- Children's books: The Story of Johnny and Jemima (1936); The Children of the Desert (1947); The Animal's Breakfast (1950); Catriona and the Grasshopper (1957); Priscilla and the Prawn (1960); The Girl with the Flower (1966).
- Poetry: Twenty-three Poems (1931); Under the Eyelid (1935); Reflexions (1947); Collected Poems (1956); The Rose in the Tree (1964); The Clock (1973); On a Ledge (1992).
- Novels: Singing Out of Tune (1933); Landscape with Figures (1934); A Week by the Sea (1936); Lady Crushwell's Companion (1938); A Fugue of Cinderellas (1956); Leo and Rosabelle (1961); The Giant's Eye (1964); The Engagement (1969); Hellenic Flirtation (1978)
- Memoirs: Potpourri (1982); Personal Patchwork 1939–45 (1986); Diary Not Kept (1988).
- Songs: Ed. W. B. Yeats: Broadsides; a Collection of Old and New Songs (1935); Dublin: Cuala Press.

== Notes ==
Peerage of the United Kingdom
Preceded by Walter Guinness	Baron Moyne; 1944–1992; Member of the House of Lords (1944–1992)	Succeeded by Jonathan Guinness
