= The Guinness Partnership =

UK mutual provider of social housing services

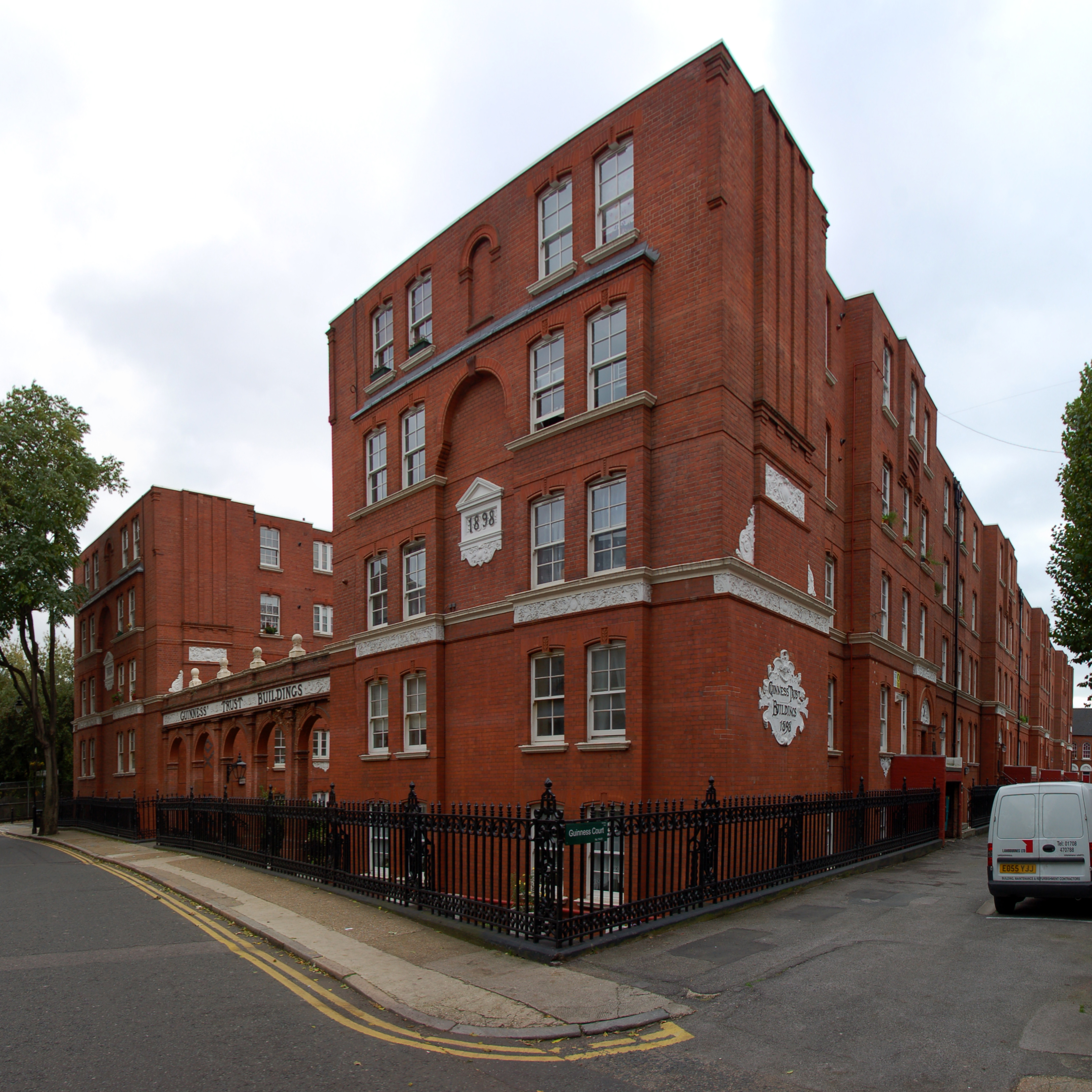
Guinness Trust Buildings in Snowsfields, London Borough of Southwark

The Guinness Partnership is one of the largest providers of affordable housing in England. Founded as a charitable trust in 1890, it is now a Community Benefit Society with eight members.

As of 2024, the Guinness Partnership owns and manages around 68,000 homes, and provides services to more than 140,000 people.

== History ==
The Guinness Trust was founded in 1890 by the then Edward Cecil Guinness, a great-grandson of the founder of the Guinness Brewery, to help homeless people in London and Dublin. Edward Cecil Guinness was created the 1st Baron Iveagh in 1891, the 1st Viscount Iveagh in 1905, and the 1st Earl of Iveagh in 1919. Lord Iveagh, as he became, donated £200,000 to set up the Guinness Trust in London, the equivalent of £25 million in today's money.

At the beginning of the 20th century, the Iveagh Trust based in Dublin took responsibility for Ireland. The Guinness Trust extended its objectives outside London in 1962, eventually operating in all parts of England. It was not related to the brewery company. The history of its first century was published by Peter Malpass in 1998.

In 1992, the Guinness Trust Group acquired the Parchment Group, parent company of Hermitage Housing Association. The combined group is now known as The Guinness Partnership. Northern Counties Housing Association joined the Partnership in 2008.

In 2022, Guinness Partnership announced that it has joined the G15 group of large housing associations in London, the body which aims to provide a collective voice for large, registered housing providers in the capital.

== Structure ==
Catriona Simons has been the current Group Chief Executive of The Partnership since 2015 and is also a serving Executive Board Member for the partnership. Catriona had also previously served as Deputy Chief Executive of the partnership after joining Guinness in December 2009. Chris Wilson is the current Chair of The Guinness Partnership Limited, a board member of Guinness Housing Association Limited, Chair of the Property Committee, and a Member of the Remuneration, Nominations, People & Culture Committee.

In 2012, the housing properties and operations of The Guinness Trust were combined with those of the other main housing divisions in the Group to form a single charitable company operating nationwide, The Guinness Partnership Limited.

The Guinness Partnership and Wulvern Housing Limited merged on 31 January 2017.

The sales and marketing team is responsible for the sales of the Partnership's shared ownership and market sale properties across England. They are known as Guinness Homes and have a separate website to the Partnership's main website.

== See also ==
- Iveagh Market
- Housing in the United Kingdom
- Real estate in the United Kingdom
