= Lady Henrietta Guinness =

Irish aristocrat

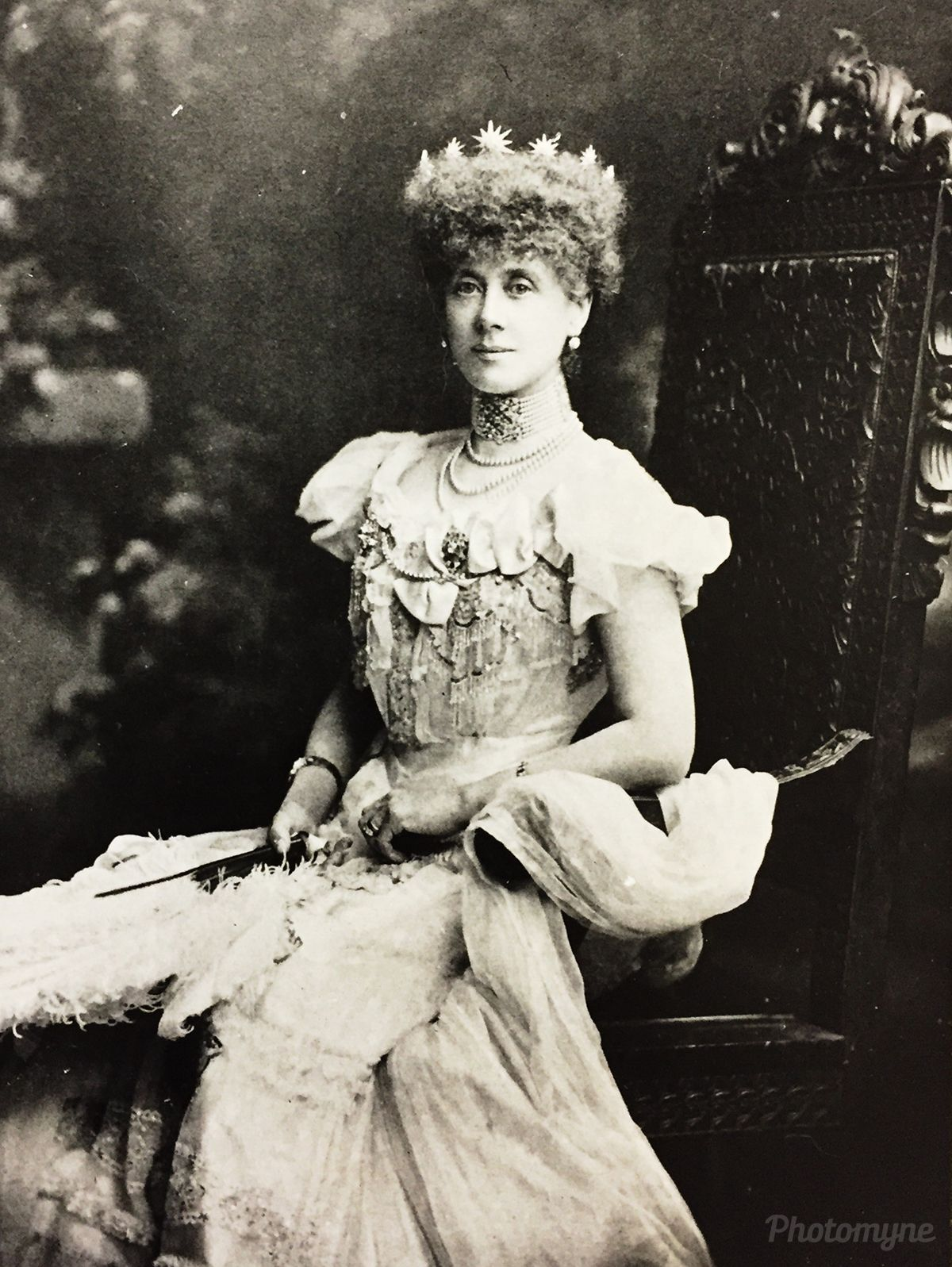
- Lady Henrietta in 1902
- Born: Henrietta Eliza St Lawrence; 1851; Dublin, Ireland
- Died: 1935 (aged 83–84); Kingston upon Thames, England
- Resting place: Putney Vale Cemetery
- Spouse: Benjamin Lee Guinness II
- Children: 3 (including Kenelm and Algernon)
- Parents: Thomas St Lawrence, 3rd Earl of Howth (father); Henrietta Elizabeth Digby Barfoot (mother)

Lady Henrietta Guinness (née Lady Henrietta Eliza St Lawrence; 1851 – 1935) was an Irish aristocrat and yachtswoman. She often accompanied her husband, Captain Benjamin Lee Guinness, on sailing trips and was known to coach yachting teams.

== Early life and family ==
Guinness was born in Dublin in 1851, the daughter of Thomas St Lawrence, 3rd Earl of Howth and his second wife, Henrietta Elizabeth Digby Barfoot. She had a sister, Lady Geraldine St Lawrence. Guinness grew up at Howth Castle.

== Adult life ==
In 1881, she married Captain Benjamin Lee Guinness, son of Sir Benjamin Lee Guinness, 1st Baronet. Her husband was the younger brother of Lord Ardilaun, Lady Plunket, and The Earl of Iveagh. She and Captain Guinness had three children: Sir Algernon Arthur St Lawrence Lee Guinness, Kenelm Edward Lee Guinness, and Nigel Digby Lee Guinness.

Guinness was an avid yachtswoman and often accompanied her husband on sailing trips. She also coached yachting teams and often attended meets in Hyde Park.

In 1907, Guinness served as a judge at a baby show at Old Windsor.

== Death and burial ==
Guinness died on 22 August 1935 in Kingston upon Thames, London. Her funeral, officiated by Rev. G. Mostyn Prichard, rector of Whippingham, took place at St. John the Baptist Church in Kingston Vale. She was buried at Putney Vale Cemetery.

== In popular culture ==
Guinness is portrayed by Elizabeth Dulau in the Netflix series House of Guinness.
