= Sir Kenelm Guinness, 4th Baronet =

British military officer and engineer

Personal details
- Born: 13 December 1928 London, England
- Died: 6 May 2011 (aged 82) Easton, Maryland, U.S.
- Spouse: Jane Fasset Nevin
- Children: 2
- Parents: Kenelm Lee Guinness (father); Josephine Strangman (mother)
- Relatives: Guinness family
- Education: Massachusetts Institute of Technology (BS)
- Occupation: engineer

Military service
- Allegiance: (United Kingdom)
- Branch/service: British Army
- Rank: Lieutenant
- Commands: Blues and Royals

Sir Kenelm Ernest Lee "Tim" Guinness, 4th Baronet (13 December 1928 – 6 May 2011) was a British military officer and engineer.

== Early life and family ==
Guinness was born in London on 13 December 1928 to Kenelm Lee Guinness and Josephine Strangman. A member of the prominent Guinness family, he was a grandson of Captain Benjamin Guinness II and a great-grandson of Sir Benjamin Guinness, 1st Baronet. His parents later divorced.

He and his sister, Geraldine, were evacuated to the United States during World War II, boarding a Portuguese freighter to travel across the Atlantic Ocean. While living in the United States, he attended the Fessenden School in Massachusetts and helped in the war effort by participating in radio shows. Following The Blitz, Guinness and his sister returned to England, where he enrolled at Eton College.

== Career ==
Guinness went into military service, as an officer of the Blues and Royals, one of the Household Cavalry divisions of the British Army. He was promoted to the rank of lieutenant.

He moved back to the United States in the 1950s to study civil engineering at the Massachusetts Institute of Technology, graduating with a bachelor of science degree. He worked for the International Bank for Reconstruction and Development for twenty-one years. Guinness designed dams in the Middle East and Southern Asia for the World Bank, and worked on the Indus Basin project in India. After his retirement in 1975, he worked in the private sector as an engineering consultant in Washington, D.C.

== Personal life ==
On 26 October 1954, Guinness succeeded his uncle, Sir Algernon Guinness, as the 4th Guinness baronet of Ashford. He was made a Knight Bachelor in 1998.

He married Jane Fasset Nevin, an American woman, in 1961. They had two sons: Sir Kenelm Ernest Lee Guinness and Sean Guinness. They moved to Claiborne, Maryland in 2003.

Guinness was a member of the Kollegewidgwok Yacht Club, the Cruising Club of America, the Calvary and Guards Club, the Household Division Yacht Club, and the Blue Hill Country Club and was an avid yachtsman, sailor, and skier.

He died in an automobile accident on 6 May 2011 in Easton, Maryland.
