= Sir Algernon Guinness, 3rd Baronet =

Anglo-Irish racing driver

Personal details
- Born: 11 May 1883
- Died: 20 October 1954 (aged 71) Berkshire, England
- Spouse: Winifred Hall
- Children: 1
- Parents: Benjamin Guinness II (father); Lady Henrietta St Lawrence (mother)
- Education: Eton College
- Occupation: racing driver

Military service
- Allegiance: (United Kingdom)
- Branch/service: Royal Naval Volunteer Reserve; Royal Air Force Volunteer Reserve
- Rank: Lieutenant commander Flight lieutenant

Sir Algernon Arthur St. Lawrence Lee Guinness, 3rd Baronet (11 May 1883 – 20 October 1954) was an Anglo-Irish racing driver and military reserves officer.

== Early life and family ==
He was born on 11 May 1883 to Captain Benjamin Lee Guinness II and Lady Henrietta St Lawrence. His paternal grandfather, Sir Benjamin Guinness, 1st Baronet, was a brewer and philanthropist. His maternal grandfather was Thomas St Lawrence, 3rd Earl of Howth. Guinness had two brothers, Kenelm Lee Guinness and Nigel Digby Lee Guinness. He was the nephew of Lord Ardilaun, Lady Plunket, and Lord Iveagh.

Guinness was educated at Eton College.

== Career ==
Guinness was a racing driver, and hired his brother, Kenelm, as his mechanic. He funded his motor racing with his inheritance from the Guinness family, competing in his first speed trials in Portmarnock in 1904 and later participating in th Gaillon hill climb in France, reaching a record speed of 89 mph. He completed the Ostend speed trials, reaching a top speed of 117 mph, in 1906. Later that year, Guinness purchased an 18-litre V8 Darracq, and used it in his Brooklands race in September, reaching a speed of 115 mph. He placed third in the Isle of Man Tourist Trophy in 1907 and placed second and third in two circuit races in Ardennes. Guinness crashed through a barrier during the 1908 Isle of Man Tourist Trophy after failing to make a turn while going 80 mph, killing a spectator.

Guinness served in the Royal Naval Volunteer Reserve during World War I as an acting lieutenant commander, from 1914 to 1918.

Like his parents, Guinness was fond of sailing and yachting, and raced a high-speed boat in the 1920 British International Trophy for the Harmsworth Cup, but lost to the American racer Garfield Wood. He returned to motor racing and, in 1922, he won the Isle of Man Tourist Trophy for voiturettes, reaching an average speed of 53 mph over a distance of 226 miles. Following his retirement from racing, Guinness served as a steward of the British Racing Drivers' Club and the Royal Automobile Club.

Guinness again served during World War II, this time as a flight lieutenant in the Royal Air Force Volunteer Reserve, where he was involved in air-sea rescues.

== Personal life ==
Guinness was married to Winifred Hall, with whom he had one daughter, Susan Rosemary Lee Guinness. He succeeded his uncle, Arthur Guinness to the Guinness baronetcy of Ashford in 1915.

Following his brother's death in 1937, at the inquest of the coroner, Guinness produced a letter indicating the likelihood that his brother died by suicide.

Guinness died on 26 October 1954 at his home in Cookham, Berkshire and was buried there.
