= Benjamin Guinness II =

Anglo-Irish military officer

Captain Benjamin Guinness II
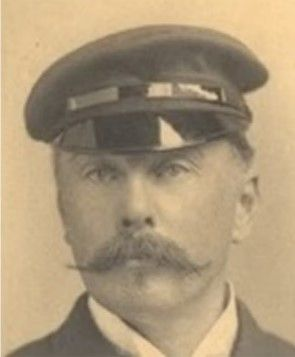

Personal details
- Born: 4 August 1842 County Kerry, Ireland
- Died: 2 February 1900 (aged 57) Bournemouth, England
- Spouse: Lady Henrietta St Lawrence
- Children: 3 (including Kenelm and Algernon)
- Parent(s): Sir Benjamin Guinness, 1st Baronet; Elizabeth Guinness

Military service
- Allegiance: (United Kingdom)
- Branch/service: British Army
- Rank: Captain
- Commands: Royal Horse Guards

Benjamin Lee Guinness II (4 August 1842 – 2 February 1900) was an Anglo-Irish military officer in the Royal Horse Guards.

== Early life and family ==
Guinness was born on 4 August 1842. A member of the prominent Guinness family, he was the son of Sir Benjamin Guinness, 1st Baronet and Elizabeth Guinness. He was the brother of Lord Ardilaun, Lord Iveagh, and Lady Plunket.

== Adult life ==
Guinness married Lady Henrietta St Lawrence, daughter of the 3rd Earl of Howth, on 6 September 1881. They had three children: Algernon, Kenelm, and Nigel.

He served in the British Army as a captain in the Royal Horse Guards.

Guinness died on 2 February 1900. His funeral was held at All Saints' Church, Raheny, where he was later buried.

== In popular culture ==
Guinness is portrayed by Fionn O'Shea in the 2025 Netflix series House of Guinness.
