= Guinness baronets =

Baronetcy in the Baronetage of the United Kingdom

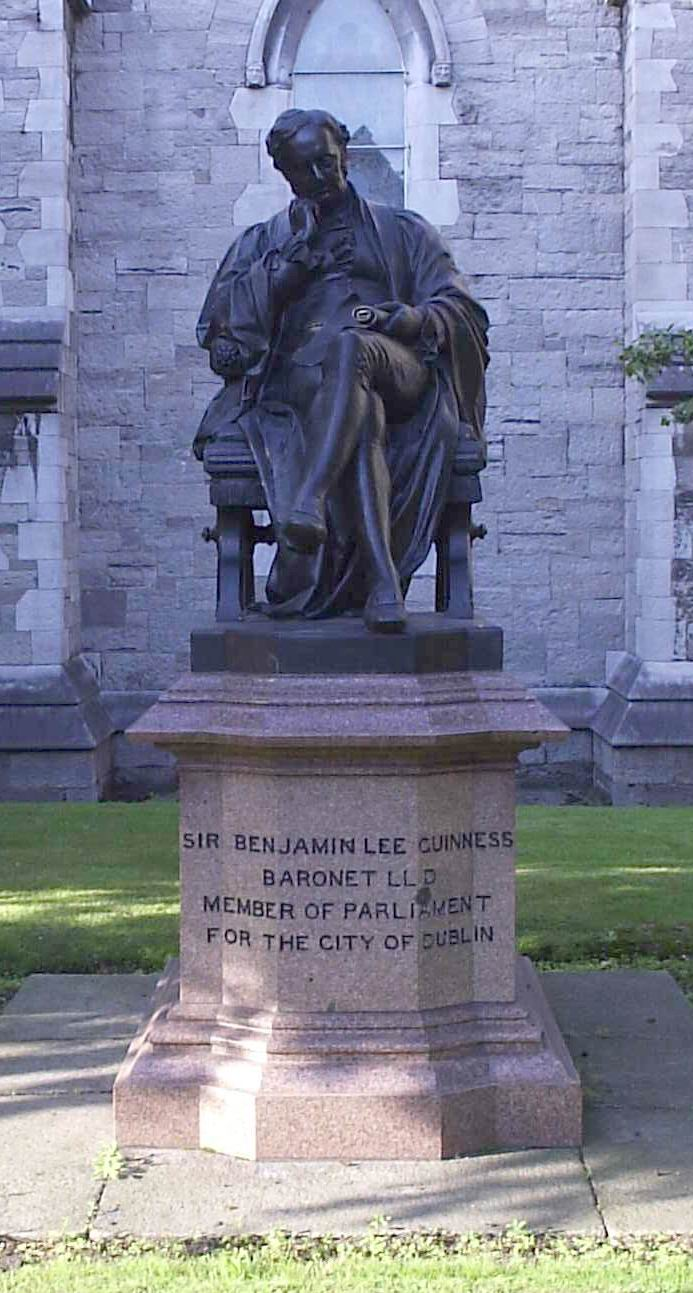
Statue in Dublin of Sir Benjamin Guinness, 1st Baronet

There have been two baronetcies created for members of the Guinness brewing family, both in the Baronetage of the United Kingdom. As of 2014 both titles are extant.

The Guinness baronetcy, of Ashford in the County of Mayo, is a title in the Baronetage of the United Kingdom. It was created on 15 April 1867 for the brewer, philanthropist and conservative member of Parliament Benjamin Guinness. He was a grandson of Arthur Guinness, the founder of the Guinness brewery. His son, the second baronet, was also a businessman and conservative politician and contributed to numerous charitable causes. On 1 May 1880 he was created Baron Ardilaun, of Ashford in the County of Mayo, in the Peerage of the United Kingdom.

Lord Ardilaun was childless and the barony became extinct on his death in 1915. However, he was succeeded in the baronetcy by his nephew Sir Algernon, the third baronet, the son of Benjamin Lee Guinness, second son of the first baronet. As of 2014 the title is held by the third baronet's great-nephew, the fifth baronet, who succeeded his father in 2011. He is the grandson of the racing driver Kenelm Lee Guinness, grandson of the first baronet.

The family seat was Ashford Castle, near Cong, County Galway.

The Guinness baronetcy, of Castleknock in the County Dublin, was created in the Baronetage of the United Kingdom on 27 May 1885 for Edward Guinness. He was the third son of the first baronet of the 1867 creation. Guinness was later elevated to the peerage as Earl of Iveagh. For more information, see this title. The 1st Baron Moyne was the third son of the 1st Earl of Iveagh.

== Guinness baronets, of Ashford (1867) ==
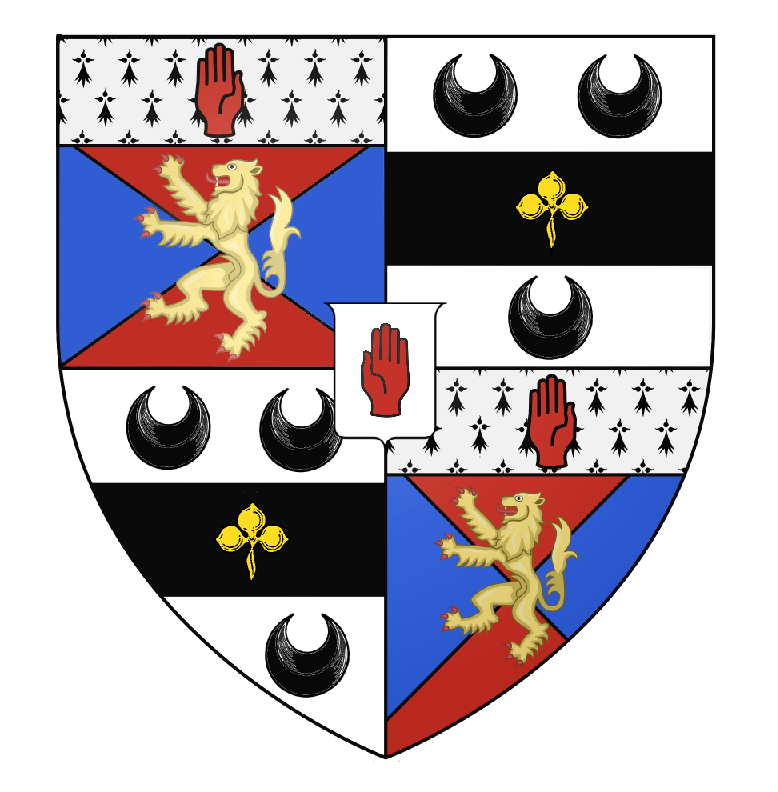
Arms of Guinness, Baronet of Ashford and St. Stephen's Green: Quarterly, 1st and 4th, Per saltire Gules and Azure a Lion rampant Or on a Chief Ermine a Dexter Hand couped at the wrist of the first (for Guinness); 2nd and 3rd, Argent on a Fess between three Crescents Sable a Trefoil slipped Or (for Lee), with canton of baronet

- Sir Benjamin Lee Guinness, 1st Baronet (1798–1868)
- Sir Arthur Edward Guinness, 2nd Baronet (1840–1915) (created Baron Ardilaun in 1880)

=== Barons Ardilaun (1880) ===
- Arthur Edward Guinness, 1st Baron Ardilaun (1840–1915)

=== Guinness baronets, of Ashford (1867; reverted) ===
- Sir Algernon Arthur St Lawrence Lee Guinness, 3rd Baronet (1883–1954)
- Sir Kenelm Ernest Lee Guinness, 4th Baronet (1928–2011)
- Sir Kenelm Edward Lee Guinness, 5th Baronet (born 1962)

The heir apparent is the present holder's only son, Kenelm Arthur Lee Guinness (born 2005).

== Guinness baronets, of Castleknock (1885) ==
Arms of Guinness, Baronet of Castleknock: Quarterly, 1st and 4th, Per saltire Gules and Azure a Lion rampant Or on a Chief Ermine a Dexter Hand couped at the wrist of the first, a crescent for difference (for Guinness); 2nd and 3rd, Argent on a Fess between three Crescents Sable a Trefoil slipped Or (for Lee), with canton of baronet

- see Earl of Iveagh

== Title succession chart ==
Guinness family tree including: Guinness baronets, Barons Ardilaun, Barons Moyne, and Earls of Iveagh

Arthur Guinness; 1725–1803
Arthur Guinness II; 1768–1855
Guinness baronetcy of Ashford, 1867
Benjamin Lee Guinness; 1798–1868; 1st Baronet
Baron Ardilaun, 1880	Guinness baronetcy of Castleknock, 1885; Baron Iveagh, 1891; Viscount Iveagh, 1905; Earl of Iveagh and Viscount Elveden, 1919
Arthur Edward Guinness; 1840–1915; Baron Ardilaun, 2nd Baronet	Benjamin Lee Guinness II; 1842–1900	Edward Cecil Guinness; 1847–1927; 1st Earl of Iveagh, etc.
Barony Ardilaun extinct
Baron Moyne
Algernon Guinness; 1883–1954; 3rd Baronet	Kenelm Edward Lee Guinness; 1887–1937	Rupert Edward Cecil Lee Guinness; 1874–1967; 2nd Earl of Iveagh	Walter Edward Guinness; 1880–1944; 1st Baron Moyne
Kenelm Guinness; 1928–2011; 4th Baronet	Richard Guinness; 1906–1906	Arthur Guinness; 1912–1945 styled Viscount Elveden	Bryan Walter Guinness; 1905–1992; 2nd Baron Moyne
Kenelm Guinness b. 1962; 5th Baronet	Benjamin Guinness; 1937–1992; 3rd Earl of Iveagh	Jonathan Bryan Guinness b. 1930; 3rd Baron Moyne	Desmond Walter Guinness; 1931–2020
Kenelm Guinness b. 2005	Edward Guinness b. 1969; 4th Earl of Iveagh	Jasper Jonathan Richard Guinness; 1954–2011	Valentine Guy Bryan Guinness b. 1959	Sebastian Walter Denis Guinness b. 1964	Patrick Desmond Carl Alexander Guinness b. 1956
Arthur Benjamin Geoffrey Guinness b. 2002 styled Viscount Elveden	Tom Guinness b. 1991

== See also ==
- Guinness family

== Sources ==
- Kidd, Charles; Williamson, David, eds. (1990). Debrett's Peerage and Baronetage (1990 ed.). New York: St Martin's Press.
