= House of Guinness =

2025 British-Irish historical drama television series

- Genre: Historical drama
- Created by: Steven Knight
- Written by: Steven Knight
- Directed by: Tom Shankland; Mounia Akl
- Starring: Anthony Boyle; Louis Partridge; Emily Fairn; Fionn O'Shea; Niamh McCormack; Seamus O'Hara; Michael McElhatton; David Wilmot; Dervla Kirwan; James Norton; Jack Gleeson; Danielle Galligan; Ann Skelly
- Music by: Ilan Eshkeri
- Countries of origin: Ireland; United Kingdom
- Original language: English
- No. of series: 1
- No. of episodes: 8

Production
- Executive producers: Karen Wilson; Elinor Day; Steven Knight; Martin Haines; Tom Shankland; Ivana Lowell
- Producers: Cahal Bannon; Howard Burch
- Cinematography: Nicolai Brüel; Joe Saade
- Editor: Ben Yeates
- Running time: 44–55 min
- Production companies: Kudos; Nebulastar

Original release
- Network: Netflix
- Release: 25 September 2025 – present

House of Guinness is a historical drama television series created by Steven Knight, that focuses on the Guinness family during the 19th century. The series premiered on 25 September 2025 on Netflix. In June 2026, the show was renewed for a second series.

== Premise ==
The series is about the Anglo-Irish origin family behind the Guinness brewing company in 19th-century British-ruled Ireland and New York. It follows the consequences of the death of Sir Benjamin Guinness, 1st Baronet, the man responsible for the extraordinary success of the Guinness brewery, and the fates of his four adult children: Arthur, Edward, Anne, and Benjamin.

== Cast and characters ==
=== Main ===
- Anthony Boyle as Arthur Edward Guinness, the eldest son of the Guinness family
- Louis Partridge as Edward Cecil Guinness, the youngest son of the Guinness family
- Emily Fairn as Anne Lee Plunket (née Guinness), the eldest sibling and only daughter of the Guinness family
- Fionn O'Shea as Benjamin Lee Guinness II, the middle son of the Guinness family
- Niamh McCormack as Ellen Cochrane, a local Fenian organiser who is committed to the Irish Republican cause
- Seamus O'Hara as Patrick Cochrane, a local Fenian organiser and Ellen's brother
- Michael McElhatton as John Potter, the Guinness family butler
- David Wilmot as Bonnie Champion, a Guinness exporter and kingpin of local illicit businesses
- Dervla Kirwan as Agnes Guinness, aunt to the Guinness siblings
- James Norton as Sean Rafferty, the Catholic unionist warehouse foreman and head of security for the Guinness Brewery
- Jack Gleeson as Byron Hedges, a distant cousin and business partner of the Guinness siblings
- Danielle Galligan as Lady Olivia Hedges-White, an aristocrat who agrees to marry Arthur
- Ann Skelly as Adelaide Guinness, cousin of the Guinness siblings

=== Supporting ===
- Michael Colgan as Reverend Henry Grattan Guinness, uncle to the Guinness siblings
- Tim Creed as Reverend William Plunket, Anne's husband
- Jessica Reynolds as Lady Christine O'Madden, Benjamin's closest friend
- Cassian Bilton as Michael
- Hilda Fay as Sultan, a nurse and resident of the Cloonboo estate
- Elizabeth Dulau as Lady Henrietta St. Lawrence, Benjamin's wife
- Nick Preston as Cahal Nelson
- Moe Dunford as William Randall Roberts
- Rob Houchen as Lord Arthur Clinton
- Declan Conlon as Isaac Butt
- Cúán Hosty-Blaney as Patrick

== Episodes ==
No.	Title	Directed by	Written by	Original release date
1	"Episode 1"	Tom Shankland	Steven Knight	September 25, 2025
Patriarch Sir Benjamin Lee Guinness dies, leaving his enterprise to his four children: the witty Arthur, who has recently returned from five years away in London; business-savvy Edward; confident and commanding Anne; and the disturbed Ben, who suffers alcohol and laudanum dependencies. The Irish Republican Brotherhood, known as the Fenians, riot during his funeral, protesting Guinness' business ties with the English, but Guinness warehouse foreman Sean Rafferty employs measured violence to ensure the streets are cleared. Anne, who has been having an affair with Rafferty, gives the warehousemen a pay rise for their loyalty. Ben fears for his life over unpaid debts owed to Bonnie Champion, who runs Guinness exports, alongside illicit businesses at the docks. When his sweetheart, Christine, offers to pay in exchange for him giving up drinking, Ben declines. Local Fenian leader Patrick Cochrane burns the barrels of the Guinness cooperage, while his cunning sister, Ellen, offers Bonnie a year without Brotherhood taxes if he shares what he knows of the Guinness siblings. Bonnie exposes Ben's mental illness, but Ellen makes it clear Arthur is her interest, implying he has scandalous ties to Bonnie's prostitution business. Arthur, uninterested in brewing, plans to sell the business to Edward.
2	"Episode 2"	Tom Shankland	Steven Knight	September 25, 2025
Rafferty seeks the warehousemen who left the gates to the cooperage open, allowing Cochrane's men to enter and burn it down. Sir Benjamin's will dictates that his legacy be split jointly between Arthur and Edward, with a clause that should either decline to run the business, they will receive no inheritance, while Anne receives nothing, and Ben receives a modest trust fund. Anne confides in Edward regarding fears over her health. Bonnie tells Ben about Ellen's hunt for Arthur's "expensive" secrets. Arthur reveals to his secret lover, Michael, that he must remain in Dublin. Meanwhile, Edward charges Anne with finding suitable wives for him and Arthur, both aware of Arthur's homosexuality. Rafferty ultimately discovers the Cochranes' activities and issues warnings to them. He and Edward confront Arthur about anonymous blackmail sent by Ellen, threatening to expose Arthur's visits to Bonnie's male prostitutes. For their silence, Bonnie demands cash, while the Fenians want Arthur's support in Parliament. Though shaken, Arthur rejects the threat. Edward forbids Rafferty from fraternising with Anne.
3	"Episode 3"	Tom Shankland	Steven Knight	September 25, 2025
Anne travels through County Galway and suffers a miscarriage in Cloonboo, part of the family's estate, aided by local nurse Sultan. Aunt Agnes and Arthur meet with the headstrong Lady Olivia Hedges, a cash-poor member of the landed gentry who looks down upon trade business. Arthur is charmed by her insistence on honest communication, and the two openly arrange a lavender marriage in which Arthur can offer her and her family a lavish place in the aristocracy, while they each lead separate intimate lives. Edward is propositioned by Byron Hedges, a distant cousin born a bastard from a Guinness mother and Fenian father, who offers to expand the business to New York. Ben applies for the military. Sultan recounts the history of the Great Famine in Cloonboo, devastating Anne and inciting her commitment to philanthropy. Arthur and Edward clash over Edward's interest in attracting political favour for the family by offering workers' benefits, tolerating the Fenians, and promoting Celtic culture. Edward publicly meets Ellen at the Imperial Hotel, offering the potential of a symbiotic relationship between the Guinnesses and the Fenians.
4	"Episode 4"	Tom Shankland	Steven Knight	September 25, 2025
Arthur and Olivia marry. At the wedding, Edward struggles to find a suitable wife, while Ben demands a higher allowance. Olivia is immediately taken with Rafferty, who has a history of fulfilling "intimate duties" with Arthur. Arthur is furious to learn Ellen and Patrick are in attendance at Edward's invitation; Edward attempts to mediate a business discussion to benefit Arthur's chance in the upcoming Parliamentary election, but Arthur feels deeply betrayed. Byron arrives in New York City and is chased down the streets of Lower Manhattan by the Bowery Boys, a Nativist street gang who target Irish Catholics, before being rescued by his cousin's crew in the Five Points. He then successfully expands Guinness operations in New York after convincing his cousin of the Guinness family's support for the Fenian cause and offering him a cut of the profits. Anne continues to struggle with her mystery illness. Enraged to learn Arthur is recklessly attempting to rig the election by buying votes, Edward tracks him down at a secret residence and is shocked to discover Arthur post-coital with former schoolmate Lord Arthur Pelham-Clinton but admits he finally seems truly happy.
5	"Episode 5"	Tom Shankland	Steven Knight	September 25, 2025
Arthur's victory in the election is voided when charges of bribery and corruption are brought to court, deeply damaging the Guinness' reputation. Olivia embarks on an affair with Rafferty. Adelaide Guinness, who continues to reject Edward, proposes plans to build affordable housing for local families. Byron makes a deal with top-ranking thug Eamon Dodd to give the American Brotherhood 15% of every bottle sold, enraging Edward. Bonnie denies Arthur access to his illicit businesses, at Edward's command. Arthur is soon pursued by warehouseman Patrick, and the two spend the night together at the brewery. Edward visits Ellen for advice on Byron's dealings, and the two sleep together. Arthur arranges for Rafferty to spend more time with Olivia. Anne gives birth to William, named after her husband. Guinness Brewery celebrates its expansion. A well-adjusted Ben and his new wife visit for the ceremony, driving Christine to near-suicide.
6	"Episode 6"	Mounia Akl	Steven Knight	September 25, 2025
Guinness' profit sharing with the Brotherhood overseas proves politically disastrous, as American Fenians attack the British and the British retaliate by arresting Fenians in Dublin, including Patrick Cochrane. Edward confesses his affair to Arthur, and they confide in each other. At the brewery, Arthur sees Patrick, who kisses him. Edward arranges for Ellen's brother to be freed, upon the condition that he is exiled to New York. Ellen is heartbroken and feels used by Edward. In New York, Byron forces Patrick Cochrane to take on the role of financial proxy between the Brotherhood's business with Guinness and funding Fenian insurrection. While visiting Edward, Adelaide is furious over the conditions in Cloonboo, and Edward confesses his relationship with Ellen has softened his heart to further charity. Edward presents her with a peasant meal, and the two bond. Arthur invites Patrick to a secret dance, unaware that Patrick is working for the embittered Reverend Henry Grattan, who organizes a police bust.
7	"Episode 7"	Mounia Akl	Steven Knight	September 25, 2025
Patrick helps Arthur escape capture by the police, but Arthur breaks off his relationship with him. At Arthur's command, Rafferty threatens Reverend Henry's life if he does not flee Dublin. Over the course of the next year, the Guinness Trust estates are completed, and Edward falls deeper in love with Ellen, but with a new election upcoming, he painfully ends their affair. Edward and Adelaide get married. Olivia discovers she is pregnant with Rafferty's child, shocking Arthur, who fears scandal and refuses to raise a bastard heir. A drunk Ben reconnects with Christine. Sick of being blackmailed by Bonnie, Arthur and Edward, serve him a notice to quit, pay for his silence, and demolish the docks for further expansions. Byron, now an esteemed salesman, returns to lead Arthur's upcoming election campaign. Arthur and Edward reveal their respective secrets to each other.
8	"Episode 8"	Mounia Akl	Steven Knight	September 25, 2025
Patrick Cochrane illegally returns to Dublin, with instructions from the Fenian Brotherhood to assassinate Arthur. As Rafferty struggles to gather intelligence, Edward visits Ellen, who is now considered untrustworthy due to her affair with a Guinness. Edward confesses he still loves her, but she sends him away. Edward and Adelaide both admit they are not in love, but their mutual respect grows. Meanwhile, due to a pattern of indiscretion, Anne insists Christine become Ben's mistress. Olivia returns from London following an abortion and is shaken and lonely. Arthur struggles with the relationship between Olivia and Rafferty, who were meant to remain emotionally distant. He gives her the option to run away with Rafferty in dishonour or to end the affair. While she claims she will do the latter, Olivia and Rafferty arrange a way to secretly continue, vowing to be together. On the day of the Parliamentary election, Arthur gives a public speech to Dublin's constituents. Patrick Cochrane enters the crowd, aims his gun, and fires a shot.

== Production ==
The series was announced in March 2024 with the working title House of Guinness. It is produced for Netflix by Kudos. The eight-part series has Tom Shankland directing the first five episodes and Mounia Akl directing the final three. Knight and Shankland serve as executive producers alongside Karen Wilson, Elinor Day, Knight, Martin Haines and Ivana Lowell. Series producer is Cahal Bannon and Howard Burch is the producer.

Filming began in Cheshire in the summer of 2024. Filming locations also include Stockport, Liverpool, and Dublin.

On June 12, 2026, Netflix renewed the show for a second season, with filming set to begin in early 2027.

== Release ==
The eight-episode series premiered on Netflix on 25 September 2025. The platform included Irish language subtitles with the release, the first time they have been included on one of its titles.

== Reception ==
The review aggregator website Rotten Tomatoes reported a 90% approval rating based on 51 critic reviews. The website's critics consensus reads, "Overflowing with dynastic intrigue and the rough-hewn grit that distinguished creator Steven Knight's previous historical dramas, House of Guinness goes down smooth like a silky pint." Metacritic, which uses a weighted average, gave a score of 72 out of 100 based on 20 critics, indicating "generally favorable" reviews.

Although reviews from critics outside Ireland were generally positive that was not the case for reviews from Irish critics. Many critics compared it favorably to series like Downton Abbey and Succession.

Critical assessments of House of Guinness note clear instances of fictionalization. In particular, the series' depiction of Arthur Guinness's sexual identity is not supported by reliable historical or archival evidence and is therefore regarded by reviewers as speculative. Additionally, the character Sean Rafferty has no documented historical basis and is understood to be an invented figure created for dramatic purposes.

Anthony Boyle was nominated for Leading Actor – Male at the 2026 Royal Television Society Programme Awards.
