= Jonathan Pim (1806–1885) =

Irish politician (1806–1885)

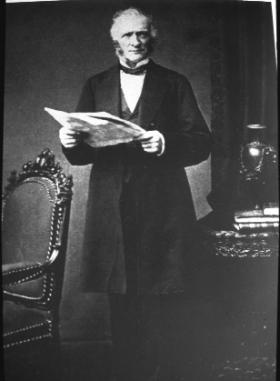
- Born: Johnathan Pim; 1806; Dublin, Ireland
- Died: July 1885 (aged 78–79)
- Resting place: Dublin
- Occupations: Businessman; Member of Parliament
- Parent: Thomas Anthony Pim

Jonathan Pim (10 June 1806 – 6 July 1885) was an Irish Liberal Party politician. He was elected as Member of Parliament (MP) for Dublin City at the 1865 general election, and held the seat until the 1874 general election, when his absence abroad when the election was called unexpectedly made it impossible to mount an effective campaign. He was president of the Statistical and Social Inquiry Society of Ireland between 1875 and 1877. A Quaker, he served as secretary for the Quaker Relief fund during the Great Irish Famine: the work involved was so exhausting that he suffered a temporary collapse of health. Nonetheless, he retained a lifelong interest in efforts to alleviate the poverty-stricken condition of the Irish. Under his guidance, the family firm, Pim Brothers, opened a pioneering department store in South Great George's Street in Dublin city centre. He had a reputation for being an especially generous employer. He is buried in the Friends Burial Ground, Dublin in Blackrock, County Dublin.

== Family ==
Pim's father was Thomas Anthony Pim, one of the Pim Brothers of Dublin, born in 1771.

Pim married Susanna Todhunter. They had a total of 10 children, of whom 6 would live to adulthood. Pim's daughter Mary was the wife of pioneering lighthouse engineer John Richardson Wigham.

Pim had several notable descendants. His grandson Jonathan Ernest Pim was a lawyer who would hold a number of government positions including Attorney-General for Ireland and briefly Lord Justice of Ireland. His great-grandchildren included Sir Richard Pim, a British naval officer based at Downing Street during World War II, and Charles Bewley, an Irish diplomat and Republican.

== Bibliography ==
- The Condition and Prospects of Ireland and the Evils arising from the Present Distribution of Landed Property with Suggestions for a Remedy. Dublin: Hodges and Smith. 1848.
- An address delivered at the opening of the thirtieth session of the Statistical and Social Enquiry Society of Ireland, being a review of the economic and social progress of Ireland since the famine (Speech).
- Ireland and the imperial Parliament.
- Is it right for a Christian to marry two sisters?. 1863.
- On the connection between the condition of tenant farmers and the laws respecting the ownership and transfer of land in Ireland.
- The Irish university question.
- The land question in Ireland, suggestions for its solution by the application of mercantile principles to dealings with land.

== Sources ==
- Harrison, Richard S. (1987). Dublin Quakers in Business 1800 — 1850 (M.Litt. thesis). Trinity College Dublin. hdl:2262/79673.
- Leigh Rayment's Historical List of MPs

Parliament of the United Kingdom
Preceded by John Vance and Sir Edward Grogan, Bt	Member of Parliament for Dublin City; 1865–1874; With: Benjamin Guinness 1865–1868; Arthur Guinness 1868–1870; Dominic Corrigan 1870–1874	Succeeded by Maurice Brooks and Arthur Guinness
