= Kenelm Lee Guinness =

British racing driver

Kenelm Lee Guinness MBE
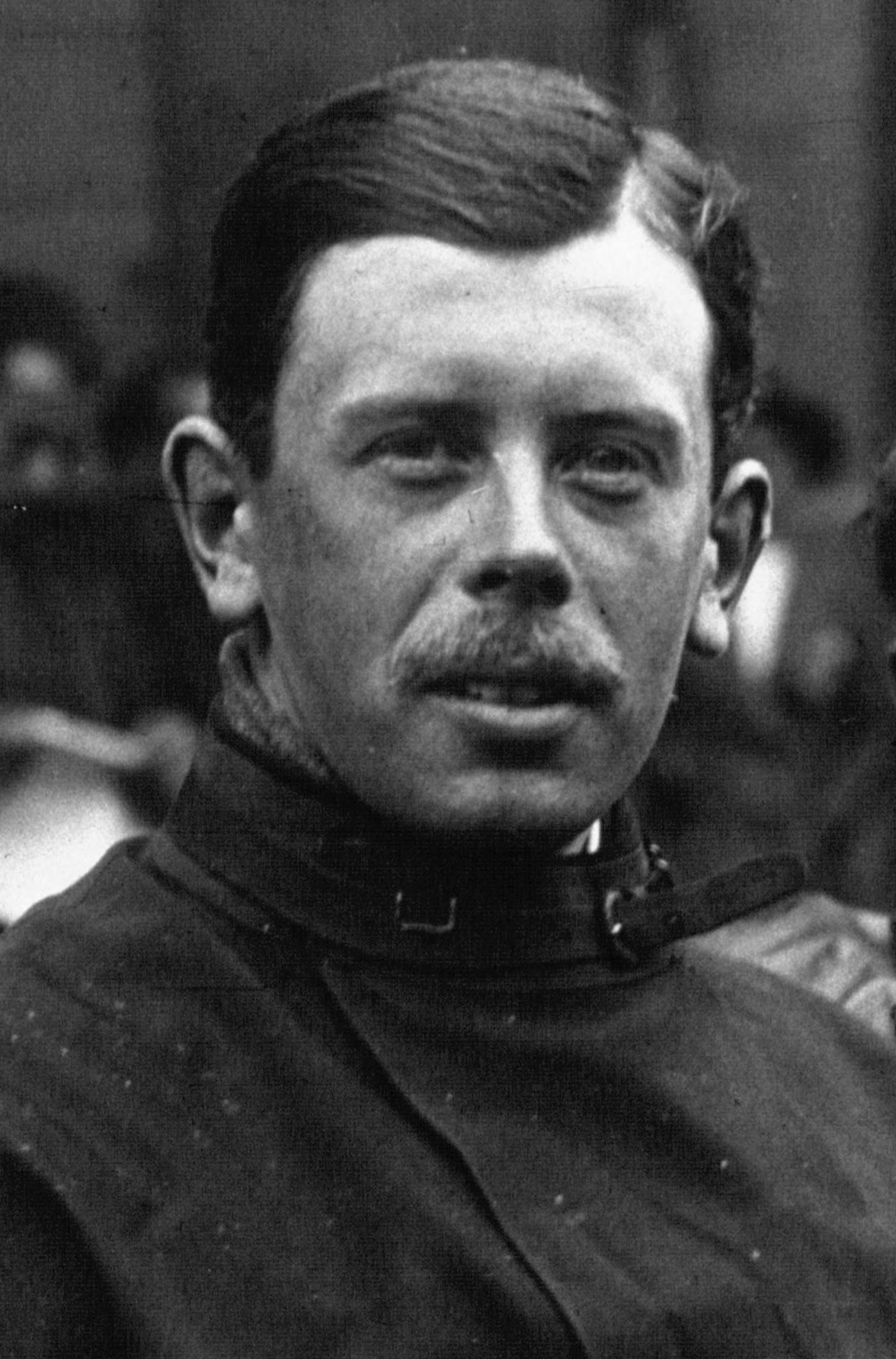
- Born: 14 August 1887; London, England
- Died: 10 April 1937 (aged 49); Kingston Hill, Surrey, England
- Resting place: Putney Vale Cemetery, London
- Occupations: Racing driver; businessman; spark plug manufacturer
- Spouse: Josephine Strangman (m. 1928; div. 1936)
- Children: 2 (including Sir Kenelm Guinness, 4th Baronet)
- Parents: Benjamin Lee Guinness (father); Lady Henrietta St Lawrence (mother)
- Relatives: Guinness family

Kenelm Edward Lee Guinness MBE (14 August 1887 – 10 April 1937) was a British racing driver of the 1910s and 1920s mostly associated with Sunbeam racing cars. He set a new Land Speed Record in 1922. Also an automotive engineer, he invented and manufactured the KLG spark plug. Additionally, aside from motorsport and mechanical interests, he was a director of the Guinness brewing company.

== Early life ==
Guinness was born on 14 August 1887 in London to Captain Benjamin Lee Guinness and Lady Henrietta St Lawrence. Known as 'Bill' to friends, he was a member of the prominent Irish Guinness family as a grandson of Sir Benjamin Guinness, 1st Baronet, and would later be a director of the brewing company. He was educated at Cambridge University, where his interests in motor racing first developed as a mechanic to his elder brother Sir Algernon Guinness.

== Career ==
=== Beginnings in motor racing ===
His first major race as a driver was the 1907 Isle of Man Tourist Trophy. His Darracq retired early, owing to axle failure. This involvement with the closely related Sunbeam, Talbot and Darracq marques continued throughout his career. In the same year he also took part in the Belgian Grand Prix at the Circuit des Ardennes.

From 1913 he was an official driver for Sunbeam, along with Henry Segrave. Sunbeam's engine designer, Louis Coatalen, became a friend and assisted his motor-racing career, driving Sunbeam or Talbot cars. This continued in 1914, 1921, 1922, 1923 and 1924 alongside such famous drivers as Jean Chassagne.

=== KLG spark plugs ===
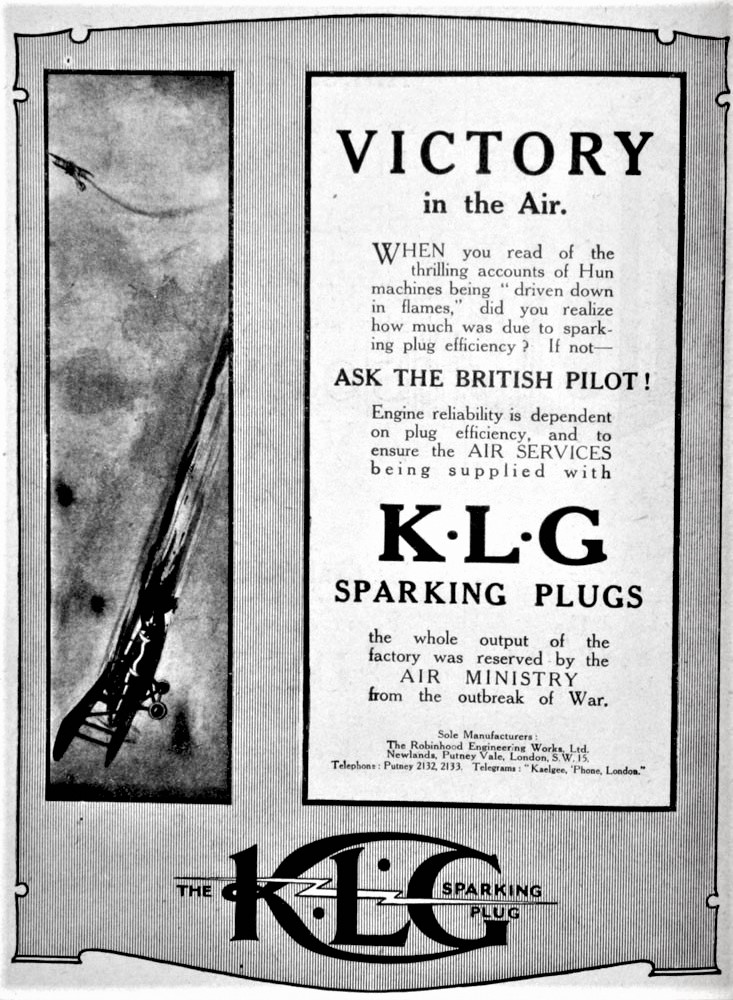
KLG spark plug advertisement, Autocar magazine, 1919

As for many racing motorists of this era, Guinness had commercial interests in automotive engineering; in this case being the inventor of the KLG spark plug, a brand name surviving today.

His experience in the 1912 Manx Tourist Trophy led him to develop a more reliable spark plug. The innovation of the KLG spark plug was its use of mica as an insulator. This mica was stacked in sheets and compressed by the centre electrode being tightened on a thread. These insulators gave more reliable performance than the porcelain ceramics used by others.

In 1912 Guinness acquired the disused 'Bald Faced Stag' inn at Putney Vale, where production of these plugs began in a small way, supplying other racers including Segrave and Malcolm Campbell. By 1914 Guinness was producing 4,000 plugs a week.

=== Robinhood Engineering Works ===
At the outbreak of the First World War Guinness joined the Royal Navy, but his work on spark plugs was considered to be more valuable to the war effort, and he was asked to resign and return to KLG. As the war continued, KLG plugs developed a reputation for reliability in aircraft use, leading to a large increase in demand. In 1917, the larger Robinhood Engineering Works were opened close to the old premises. This employed over 1,200 mainly women workers, making the factory the largest employer in the area. By 1918, the bulk of the factory's output was reserved for the Royal Air Force. In 1920 Guinness was made a member of the Order of the British Empire for his services as manager of the Robinhood Works.

In 1919, he sold world distribution rights to Smiths, then sold up completely in 1927. He remained as a consultant.

KLG's reliability was particularly attractive to the land speed record contenders and their many-cylindered aero-engines, often with dual ignition systems. Segrave's 1,000HP Sunbeam required 48 spark plugs, a mis-fire amongst which could be very difficult to detect and replace on a windswept beach.

=== Hydro-Pulsator ===
He invented the first hydro-pulsator for the treatment of gums by water-jet massage.

=== Land speed record ===
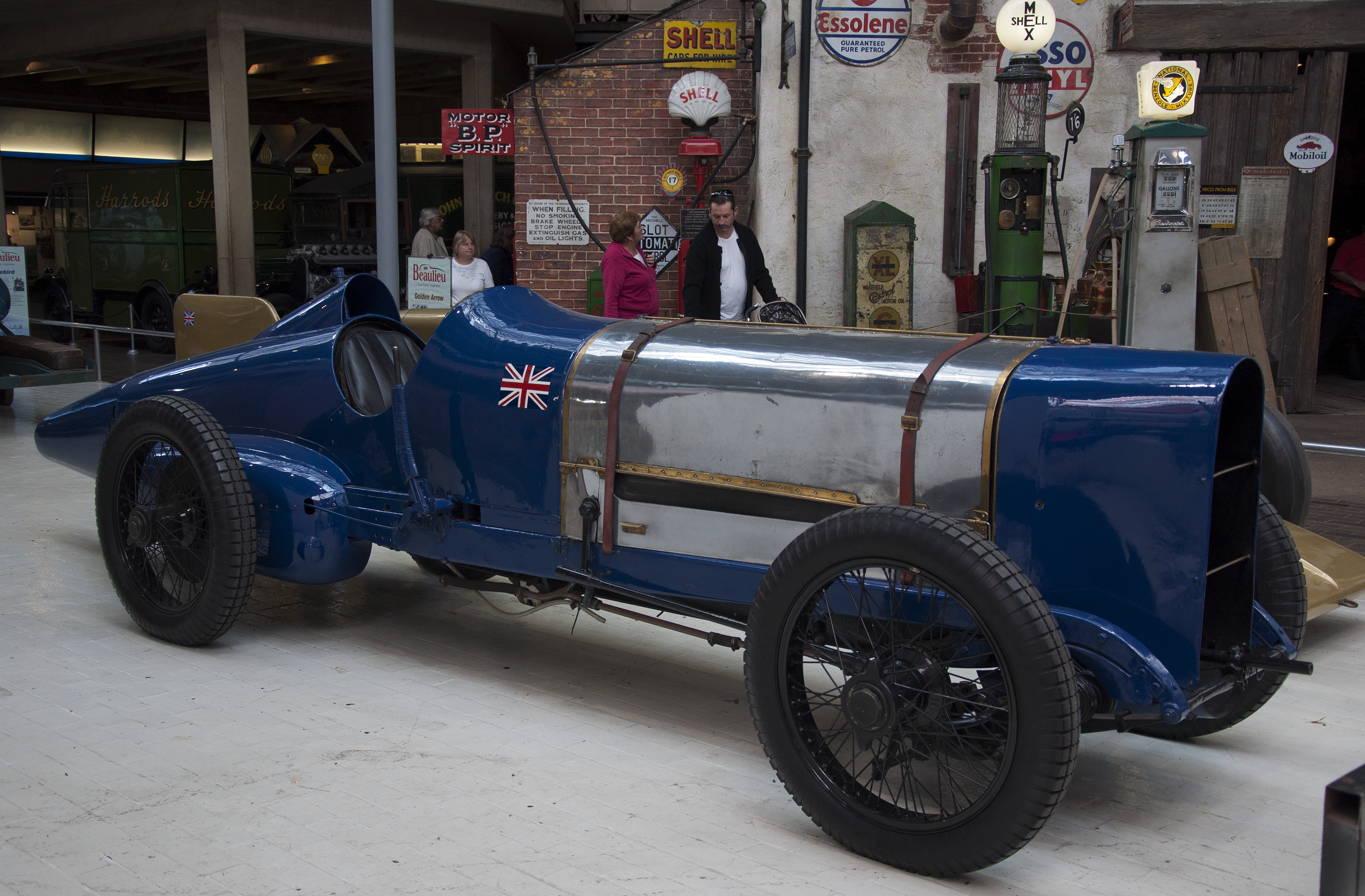
Sunbeam driven to Land Speed Records by Guinness and as Blue Bird Malcolm Campbell

After the First World War, Louis Coatalen built the Sunbeam 350HP, which was powered by a V12 Manitou engine.

On 17 May 1922, Guinness used the car to set new Land Speed Records at Brooklands, starting with the Brooklands lap record at 121.54 miles per hour (195.60 km/h), then the flying-start land speed records over a half-mile, kilometre, mile and two miles. Of the five distances, the fastest average speed was 136.05 miles per hour (218.95 km/h) for the half-mile. These were the last land speed records to be set on a racetrack rather than a beach or salt flat.

The car was later sold to Malcolm Campbell, who named it "Blue Bird" and also used it to set land speed records.

After his 1924 accident, Guinness withdrew from record-breaking as well as track competition. However, when his Sunbeam co-driver Segrave took the 1,000HP car to Daytona in 1927, Guinness accompanied him.

=== Yachting ===
In 1919, he purchased a surplus minesweeper, the 'Samuel Green' that had been converted to a fishing trawler. He renamed her the 'Ocean Rover' and had her refitted as a gentleman's yacht. Guest accommodation was provided, together with a hold equipped to transport racing cars to foreign events.

In 1926, after Guinness's retirement from motor racing, he and his friend Malcolm Campbell used the yacht for a treasure-hunting trip to the Cocos Islands.

== Complete racing record ==
=== 1913 ===
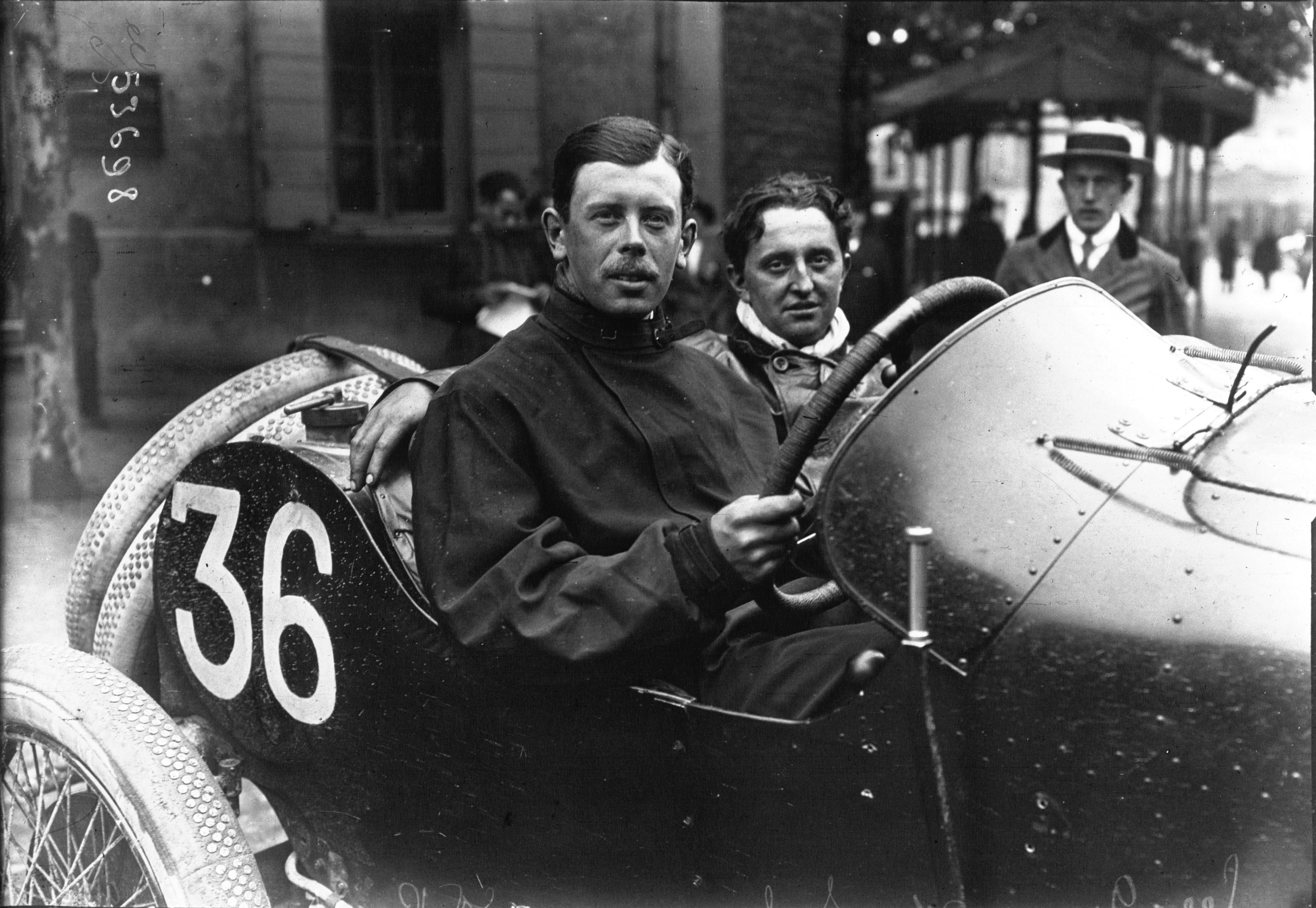
1914 French Grand Prix, (retired)

- French Grand Prix (retired)

=== 1914 ===
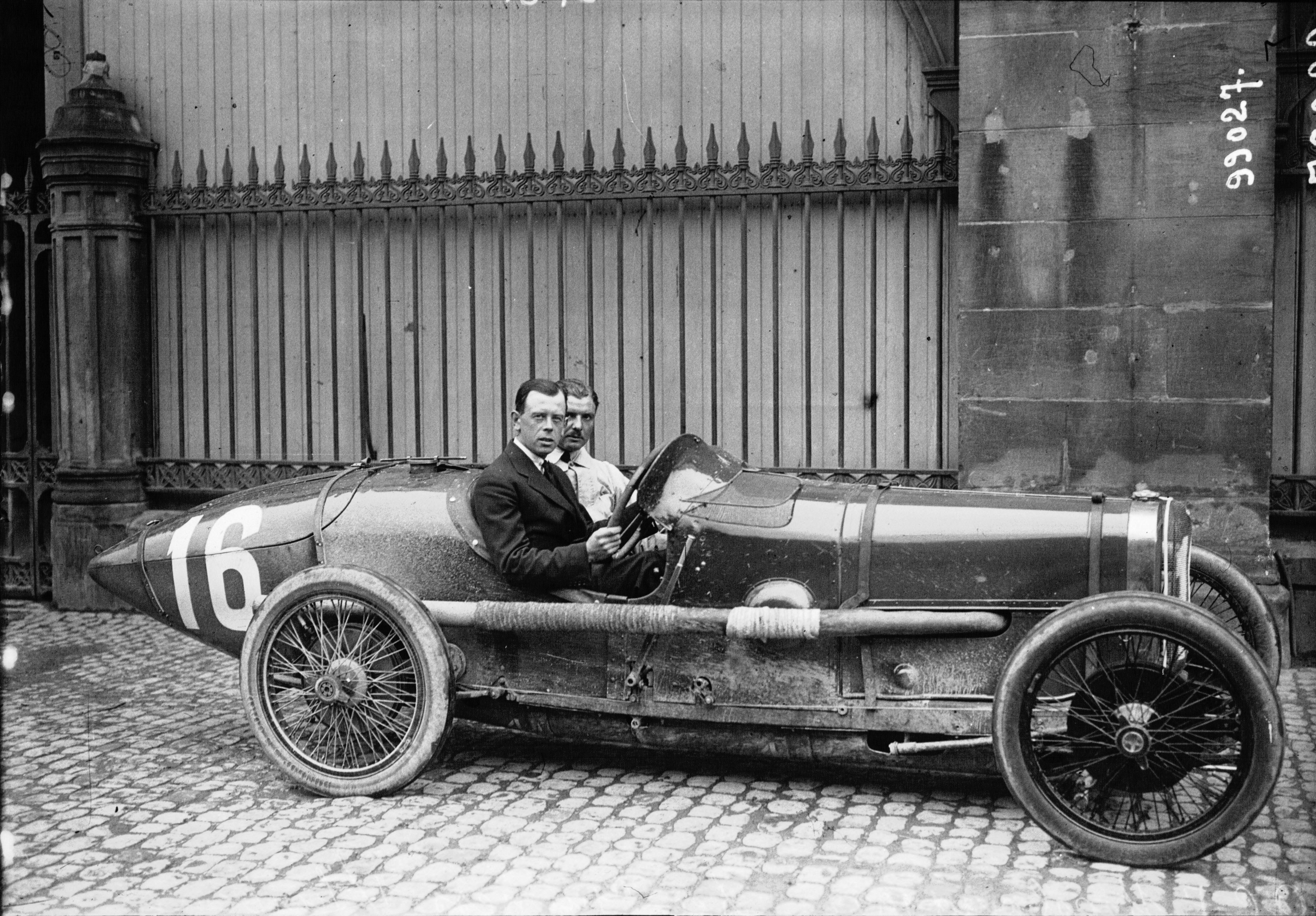
Grand Prix Sunbeams 1922 (retired)

- Winner and fastest lap, Isle of Man Tourist Trophy, 10–11 June 1914, Sunbeam TT 3.2 litre
- French Grand Prix (retired)

=== 1922 ===
- Winner, JCC 200 Brooklands, Voiturettes, 19 August 1922, Talbot-Darracq 56
- Winner, Coupe des Voiturettes Le Mans, 18 September 1922, Talbot-Darracq 56
- Winner, Penya Rhin Grand Prix, Voiturettes, 5 November 1922, Talbot-Darracq 56

=== 1924 ===
- Winner, Grand Prix de Suisse Voiturettes, Geneva, 15 June 1924, Talbot 70
- Winner, JCC 200 Brooklands, Voiturettes, 20 September 1924, Talbot 70
- Guinness crashed on 27 September 1924 in the San Sebastian Grand Prix and his riding mechanic, Tom Barrett was killed. Barrett had substituted for Guinness's regular mechanic Bill Perkins, who was recovering in hospital from injuries received three weeks earlier in a crash at Brooklands in a car driven by Dario Resta, who was killed in the accident. Guinness never raced again after San Sebastian.

== Death ==
After the 1924 crash, Guinness suffered head and other injuries. These other injuries may have been enough to end his racing career on their own, but the head injuries and the trauma of Barrett's death also changed his personality.

In his final months towards 1937, he was described as suffering delusions and was admitted to a nursing home. On 10 April 1937 he was found dead in a bedroom at his home near the KLG factory, having apparently gassed himself.

At the coroner's inquest, his brother Sir Algernon Guinness produced a letter that indicated the likelihood of suicide. The coroner's verdict was, "Suicide, while of unsound mind".

He was buried on 14 April at Putney Vale Cemetery, adjacent to the KLG factory.
