= Harry Greenwood =

British army officer and recipient of the Victoria Cross

- Born: 25 November 1881; Victoria Barracks, Windsor
- Died: 5 May 1948 (aged 66); Wimbledon, London
- Burial place: Putney Vale Cemetery, London
- Military career
- Allegiance: United Kingdom
- Branch: British Army
- Rank: Lieutenant Colonel
- Units: King's Own Yorkshire Light Infantry; Royal Pioneer Corps
- Conflicts: Second Boer War; First World War; Second World War
- Awards: Victoria Cross; Distinguished Service Order & Bar; Officer of the Order of the British Empire; Military Cross

Lieutenant Colonel Harry Greenwood, VC, DSO & Bar, OBE, MC (25 November 1881 – 5 May 1948) was a British Army officer and an English recipient of the Victoria Cross, the highest award for gallantry in the face of the enemy that can be awarded to British and Commonwealth forces.

== Early life ==
Greenwood was born in Victoria Barracks, Windsor, the eldest of nine children to Charles Greenwood and Margaret Abernethy.

== Military career ==
Greenwood was 36 years old, and an acting lieutenant colonel in the 9th Battalion, the King's Own Yorkshire Light Infantry, British Army, during the First World War, when he performed a deed for which he was awarded the Victoria Cross.

On 23 October 1918 at Ovillers, France, when the advance of the battalion was checked by enemy machine gun fire, Lieutenant-Colonel Greenwood single-handedly rushed the position and killed the crew. Subsequently, accompanied by two runners, he took another machine-gun post, but then found that his command was almost surrounded by the enemy, who started to attack. Repulsing this attack, the colonel led his troops forward, capturing the last objective with 150 prisoners, eight machine guns, and one field gun. On 24 October he again inspired his men to such a degree that the last objective was captured and the line held in spite of heavy casualties.

== Later life ==
Greenwood died in Wimbledon, aged 66 and is buried at Putney Vale Cemetery. His medal is held at the King's Own Yorkshire Light Infantry Museum in Doncaster.

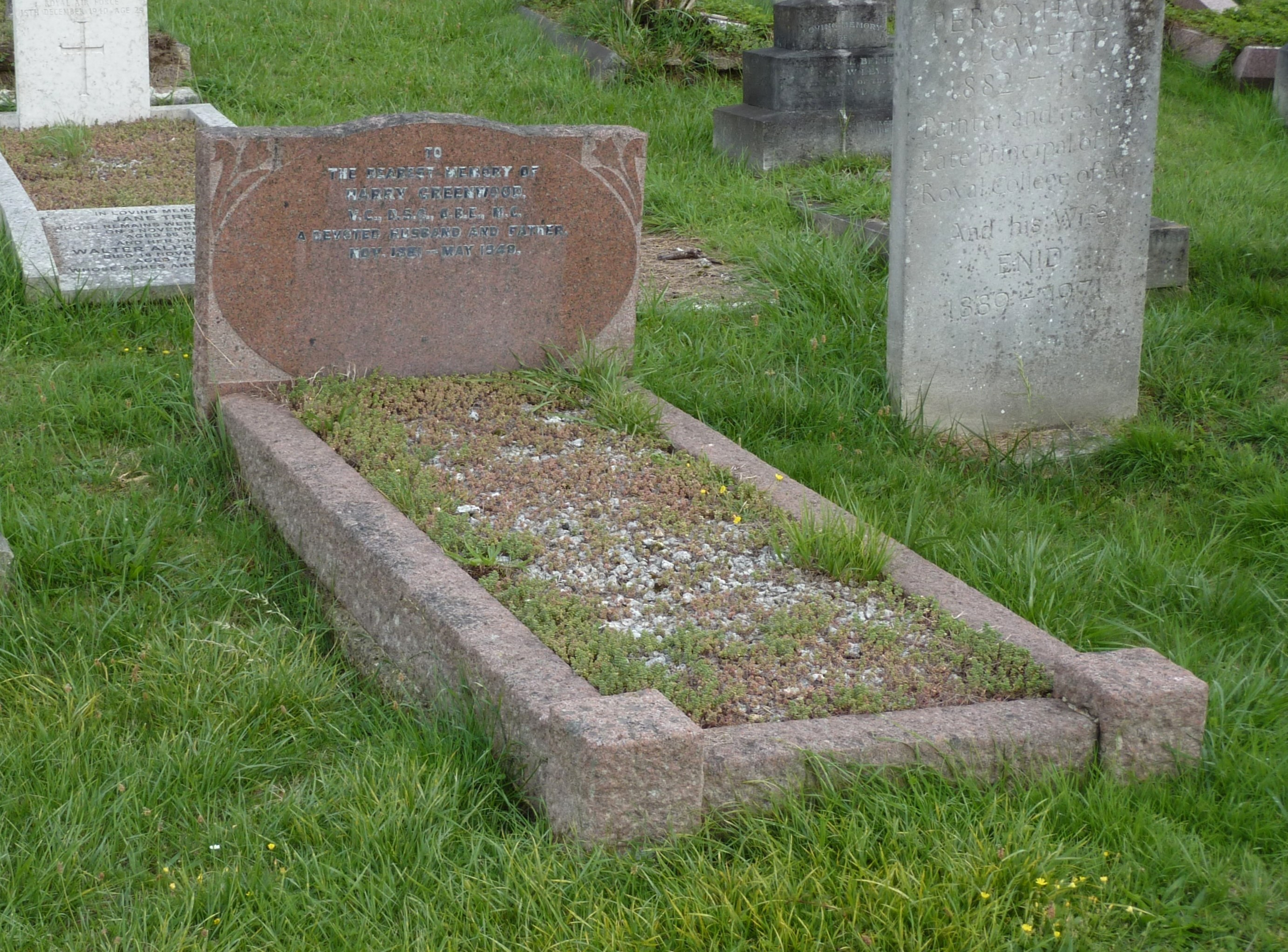
Greenwood's grave at Putney Vale Cemetery, London, in 2015

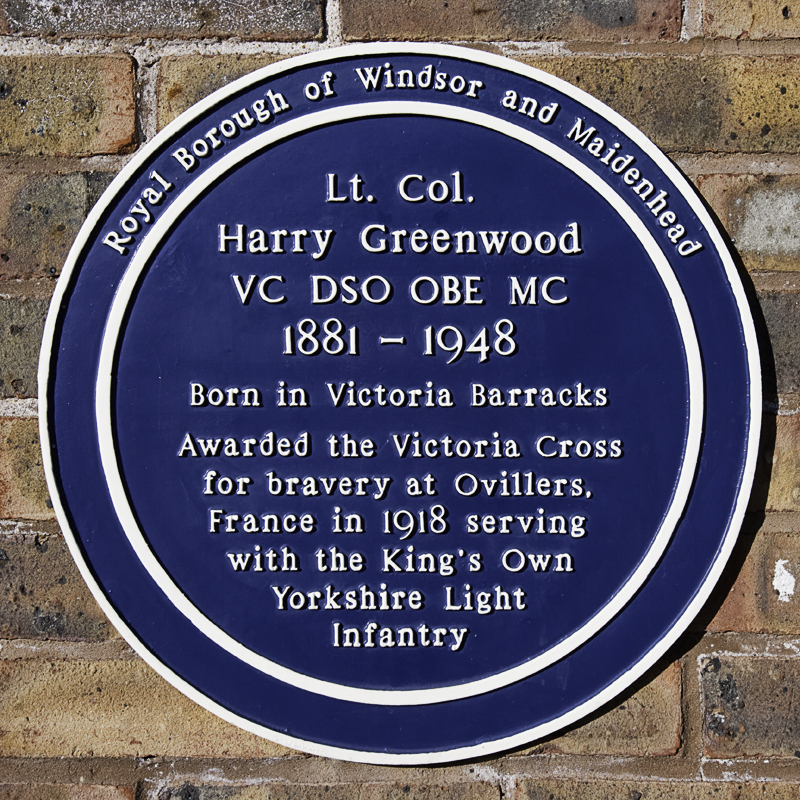
Blue Plaque at Victoria Barracks, Windsor for Harry Greenwood
