= Putney Vale Cemetery =

Cemetery in London, England

Coordinates: 51°26′25″N 0°14′38″W

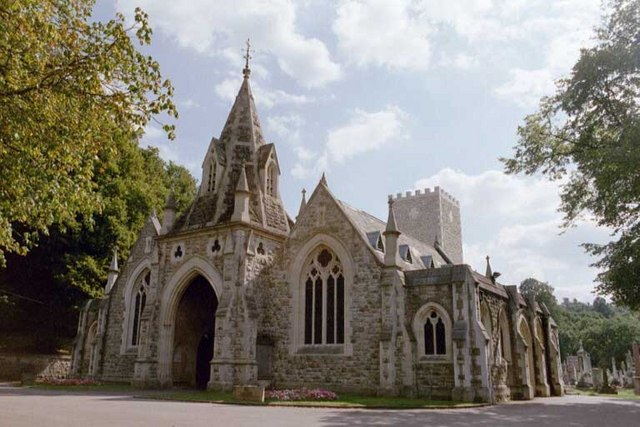
- Putney Vale Crematorium
- Interactive map of Putney Vale Cemetery

Details
- Established: 1891 (cemetery) 1938 (crematorium)
- Location: Putney Vale, London
- Country: United Kingdom
- Type: Public
- Style: Gothic Revival, Tudor Revival, Richardsonian Romanesque
- Size: 47 acres (19 ha)
- No. of graves: 2,450
- The Political Graveyard: Putney Vale Cemetery

Putney Vale Cemetery and Crematorium in southwest London is located in Putney Vale, surrounded by Putney Heath and Wimbledon Common and Richmond Park. It is located within 47 acres (19 ha) of parkland. The cemetery was opened in 1891 and the crematorium in 1938. The cemetery was originally laid out on land which had belonged to Newlands Farm, which was established in the medieval period.

== History ==
The Putney Burial Board held an opening ceremony for the cemetery in 1890, in a location described by Heber Hart as "probably one of the most beautifully situated in England." At its consecration by the Bishop of Gibraltar, Charles Sandford, nearby rifle practice by local volunteer corps caused panic, forcing some attendees to use umbrellas for cover. Following a tragic incident where a gravedigger was mortally wounded by a stray bullet, the Burial Board brought a lawsuit against the commanding officers of the volunteer regiments. Charles Swinfen Eady, Arthur Jelf and Heber Hart successfully secured an injunction from Mr Justice Romer. This restricted firing to the 200-yard point, ultimately leading to the total cessation of rifle practice on Wimbledon Common by the National Rifle Association. H.R.H. the Duke of Cambridge, then Commander-in-Chief, was reported to have said: "I was always of opinion that accidents were imminent, and that was really why I wished to see the camp changed from Wimbledon to Bisley, and I am afraid the incident of the past few days has rather confirmed the view I took at the time. I think it is a very good thing that we have gone elsewhere."

== Layout ==
The cemetery has two chapels, one being a traditional Church of England chapel and the other being used for multi-denomination or non-religious services. It has a large Garden of Remembrance.

There are 87 Commonwealth war grave burials from the First World War and 97 from the Second World War in the cemetery. Six Victoria Cross recipients have been buried or cremated here. The burials are scattered throughout the grounds of the cemetery and a Screen Wall Memorial has been erected to record the names of those whose graves are not marked by headstones. Those who have been cremated at Putney Vale Crematorium also have their names recorded on these panels.

== Notable burials and cremations ==
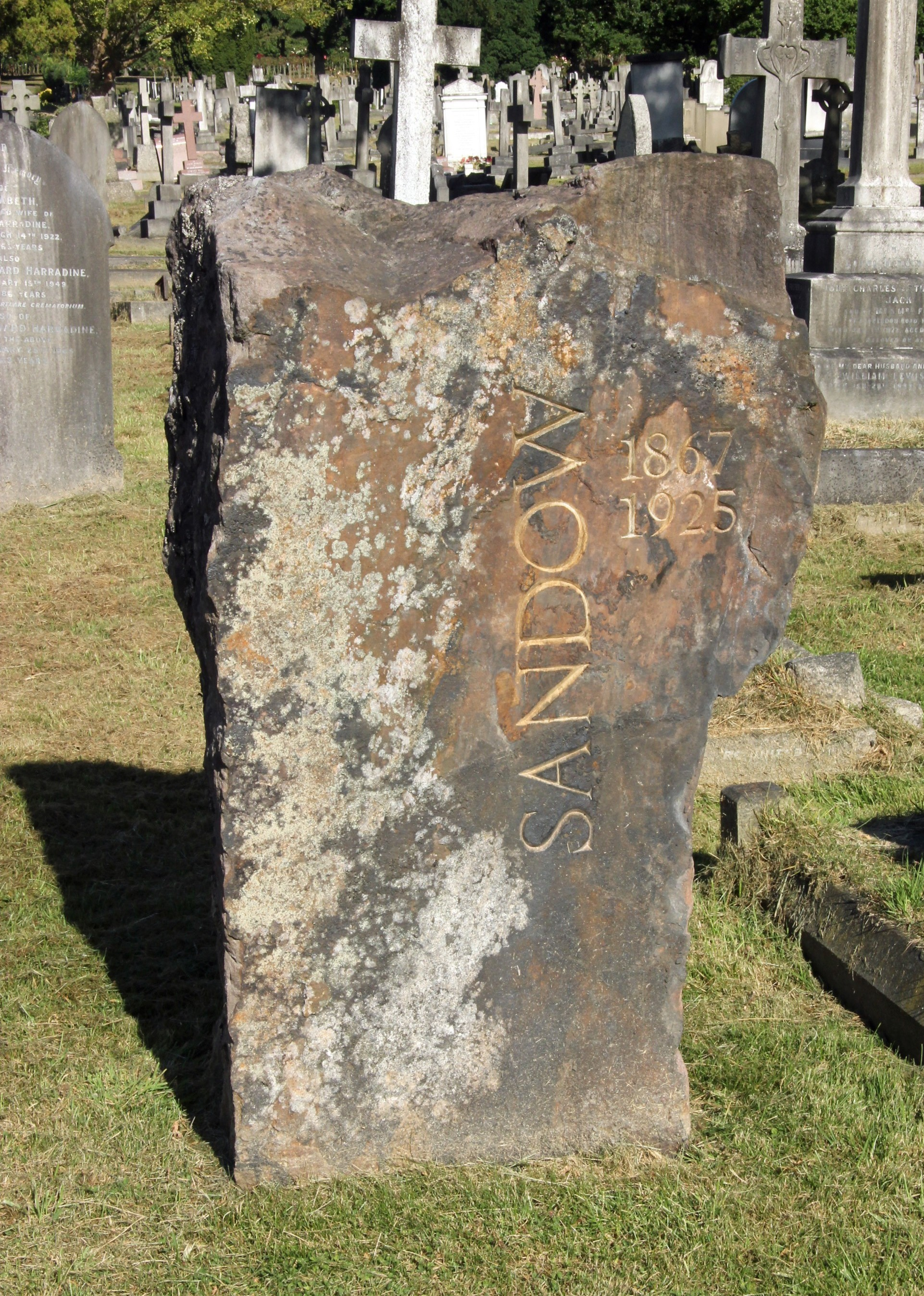
The memorial to strongman Eugen Sandow

Funerals held at Putney Vale include those of:

=== A – I ===
- Ellinor Davenport Adams, journalist and children's author
- Major General Ernest Alexander, World War I Victoria Cross recipient
- Julie Alexander, actress and model (cremated)
- Dev Anand, Indian film actor (cremated, ashes scattered in Godavari River, India)
- Peter Arne, actor
- Arthur Askey, comedian and actor (cremated)
- Sir Stanley Baker, Welsh actor and film producer (cremated, ashes scattered near Ferndale, Glamorgan)
- Sir Henry George Outram Bax-Ironside, British diplomat, ambassador to Venezuela, Chile, Switzerland and Bulgaria
- Robert Beatty, actor (cremated)
- Lady Evelyn Beauchamp (née Herbert), one of the first people to enter the tomb of Tutankhamun
- James Beck, actor noted for his role as Private Walker, the Cockney spiv in the BBC sitcom Dad's Army (cremated)
- Admiral The 1st Baron Beresford, following state funeral at St Paul's Cathedral
- John Bindon, actor
- Major-General Charles Guinand Blackader, WWI general
- Lillian Board MBE, athlete (cremated)
- Reginald Bosanquet, journalist and newsreader for Independent Television News
- William Boulter, World War I Victoria Cross recipient (cremated)
- Harry Cunningham Brodie, MP for Reigate (1906–1910) and major in the Middlesex Yeomanry
- Sheila Burrell, English actress (cremated)
- Kate Carney, famed music hall singer and comedian
- Howard Carter, archaeologist and Egyptologist, noted as a primary discoverer of the tomb of Tutankhamun
- Michael Coles, actor
- Ivy Compton-Burnett CBE, novelist (cremated)
- Alain de Cadenet, racing driver
- Sandy Denny, singer, songwriter and member of Fairport Convention
- Henry Fielding Dickens, barrister and the eighth of 10 children born to author Charles Dickens and his wife Catherine
- Clive Dunfee, racing driver
- Sir John Ellerman, shipowner and investor, believed to be the richest man in England
- Sir Jacob Epstein, sculptor
- Sid Field, English comedy entertainer
- Golchin Gilani, 20th-century Iranian poet
- Lieutenant Colonel Harry Greenwood, World War I Victoria Cross recipient
- Lady Henrietta Guinness, yachtswoman
- Kenelm Lee Guinness, local resident and member of the Guinness brewing family, early motor racer and entrepreneur behind the famous Putney Vale-made KLG spark plugs
- George Dickinson Hadley, gastroenterologist (cremated)
- Heber Hart (1865–1948), King's Counsel, judge and legal author whose legal career included securing the High Court injunction that ended rifle practice next to the cemetery grounds
- Lieutenant Colonel Reginald Hayward, World War I Victoria Cross recipient (cremated)
- Edward Hulton, newspaper proprietor
- James Hunt, Formula One Grand Prix world champion (cremated)
- Samuel Insull, Anglo-American utilities magnate
- J. Bruce Ismay, chairman of White Star Line and a passenger of its ship RMS Titanic, and wife Julia Florence Ismay

=== J – Z ===
- Hattie Jacques, comedy actress notable for the Carry On films and Sykes (cremated)
- Alexander Kerensky, exiled former Russian prime minister and leading figure in the February Revolution of 1917 in Russia
- Sultan Ali Keshtmand, exiled former prime minister of Afghanistan and leading figure in the Afghan communist period
- Greg Lake, bassist and singer with King Crimson and Emerson, Lake, & Palmer
- Sir John Lambert CMG KCVO, soldier and diplomat
- Hazel, Lady Lavery, painter
- John Lavery, painter
- Sir David Lean CBE, film director
- Rosa Lewis, hotelier of the Cavendish, Jermyn Street, known as the "Queen of Cooks" and "Duchess of Duke Street"
- Sir John William Lorden, resident of Ravenswood, Putney Hill and former president of the National Federation of Property Owners and Ratepayers
- Anna Massey (1937–2011), British actress (cremated)
- Daniel Massey, Canadian-British actor and Golden Globe award recipient
- Hilary Minster, British actor
- Kenneth More, character actor post-Second World War (cremated)
- The 1st Viscount Morley of Blackburn, OM, politician (ashes buried here after cremation at Golders Green)
- Kenneth Nelson, actor (The Boys in the Band)
- Lt-Col. Sir Henry Dickonson Nightingale, 13th Baronet, Royal Marine Officer during the Second Anglo-Burmese War in 1851–52
- Sir William Noble (1861–1943), BBC founder and GPO chief engineer
- Joe O'Gorman, music hall performer and founder of the Variety Artistes' Federation
- Sir William Orpen, KBE, RA, RHA, Irish artist and portrait painter, prolific official war artist during World War I
- Jennifer Paterson, TV chef of Two Fat Ladies fame (cremated)
- Lance Percival, actor and singer (cremated)
- Jon Pertwee, actor, noted for Worzel Gummidge and Doctor Who (cremated)
- Roy Plomley OBE, creator of the world's longest running radio programme, BBC Radio 4's Desert Island Discs
- Nyree Dawn Porter OBE, actress (cremated)
- Sir Edward J. Reed, 19th-century constructor of the Royal Navy, MP, author and railway magnate
- George Reid, former prime minister of Australia
- Alfred Joseph Richards, First World War recipient of the Victoria Cross
- Sir Ronald Ross, discoverer of malaria transmission by mosquitoes
- William Scoresby Routledge, British ethnographer, anthropologist and adventurer
- Charles Rumney Samson, pioneer naval aviator
- Eugen Sandow, Prussian known as the "father of modern bodybuilding
- Lieutenant Colonel Harry Norton Schofield, Boer War Victoria Cross recipient
- Richard Seaman, noted pre-Second World War Grand Prix driver for Mercedes-Benz, who still maintain his grave
- Vladek Sheybal, Polish character actor
- Joan Sims, comedy actress who appeared in many Carry On films (cremated)
- C. W. Stephens (c.1846–1917), British architect, best known for Harrods
- Vesta Tilley, born Matilda Alice Powles, male impersonator who was a star in both Britain and the US for over 30 years
