= Elizabeth Dulau =

English actress (born 1995)

- Born: 1995 (age 30–31); London, United Kingdom
- Education: University of Nottingham; RADA
- Years active: 2020–present

Elizabeth Dulau (born 1995; pronounced /dəˈloʊ/ də-LOH) is an English actress. On television, she is best known for her role as the gallery assistant and spy Kleya Marki in the Disney+ Star Wars series Andor (2022–2025), and Dr. Louise Pennycook in the ITV series Maternal (2023).

== Early life and education ==
Dulau holds dual British and Irish citizenship. She graduated with a bachelor's degree in environmental science from the University of Nottingham. She then trained at the Royal Academy of Dramatic Art (RADA), where she graduated in 2020 with a Bachelor of Arts (BA) in Acting (H Level). During her time at RADA, Dulau appeared in stage productions of various plays, including The Importance of Being Earnest, Julius Caesar, King Lear, The Laramie Project, The Oresteia, The Provoked Wife, and Stoning Mary.

== Career ==
Shortly after her graduation, Dulau earned her first onscreen credits by appearing in a pair of film shorts, Hard Pass and Grapes, both of which she co-starred with Saura Lightfoot-Leon, who graduated in the same class with Dulau from RADA.

Later in 2020, Dulau was cast as Kleya Marki in the Star Wars spy thriller series, Andor (2022–2025). According to showrunner Tony Gilroy, Dulau's talent was recognized by renowned Star Wars casting director Nina Gold, and she was tabbed for the role of Kleya Marki after two more-established actresses had previously backed out of the role. Marki is the assistant and enforcer to rebel spymaster Luthen Rael, played by Stellan Skarsgård, with whom Dulau auditioned. Following production delays due to the COVID-19 pandemic, Dulau filmed her scenes for Season 1 in early 2021. After appearing in seven episodes of the first season which were first broadcast in October 2022, Dulau reprised the character in series' second and final season in 2025, appearing in nine episodes and taking on an expanded role. Dulau's performance in Season 2 drew a positive critical reception.

Following production of the first season of Andor, Dulau made her television debut in April 2022 with guest appearances in two episodes of the BBC One/HBO series Gentleman Jack. She also made a guest spot in the Season 2 premiere of the BBC One/Amazon Prime dark comedy series The Outlaws that aired in June 2022.

Dulau then joined the cast of the ITV drama Maternal, which aired in early 2023. Playing Dr Louise Pennycook, Dulau appeared in all six episodes of series' only season. Later in 2023, Dulau played a small supporting role as a French Resistance fighter in the Netflix historical drama miniseries All the Light We Cannot See. She appeared again on Netflix as Lady Henrietta St. Lawrence in another historical drama miniseries House of Guinness, which premiered in September 2025.

In 2024, Dulau made her feature film debut as the voice of the Piebald Deer in the movie musical Wicked. She will appear on screen in the upcoming courtroom drama Prima Facie directed by Susanna White, and has been cast in the horror thriller Sundowning, which is being directed by Ian McDonald.

On stage, Dulau made her professional debut in 2021 at the Young Vic Theatre where she played the role of Yolandi in the play Klippies. Three years later, she performed as Ida in the Australian play The Bleeding Tree at the Southwark Playhouse. In early 2026, she took on her first lead role as Mary Ann Evans, aka George Eliot in the original dramatic play Bird Grove at the Hampstead Theatre, earning rave reviews for her performance.

== Filmography ==
=== Film ===
Year	Title	Role	Notes
2020	Grapes	Nina	Short film
2020	Hard Pass		Short film
2024	Wicked	Piebald Deer (voice)	
2026	Prima Facie	Alice Sommers	

=== Television ===
Year	Title	Role	Notes
2022	Gentleman Jack	Catherine Rawson	2 episodes
2022	The Outlaws	Lesley	1 episode
2022–2025	Andor	Kleya Marki	16 episodes
2023	Maternal	Dr. Louise Pennycook	6 episodes
2023	All the Light We Cannot See	Jacqueline Blanchard	2 episodes
2025	House of Guinness	Lady Henrietta St. Lawrence	2 episodes

== Theatre ==
- The Bleeding Tree – Ida
- Klippies – Yolandi
- The Importance of Being Earnest – Lady Bracknell
- Julius Caesar – Portia
- King Lear – Duke of Cornwall
- The Laramie Project – Romaine Patterson
- Bird Grove – Mary Ann Evans
