= Emily Fairn =

English actress (born 1998)

- Fairn in 2026
- Born: 16 September 1998 (age 28); Liverpool, England
- Education: Guildhall School of Music and Drama
- Occupation: Actress
- Years active: 2022–present

Emily Fairn (born 16 September 1998) is an English actress. On television, she is known for her roles in the BBC series The Responder (2022–2024) and the Netflix series House of Guinness (2025–). She was named a 2023 Screen International Star of Tomorrow.

== Early life ==
Fairn grew up in Stockbridge Village, Merseyside. Her mother is a bank clerk. Fairn graduated from the Guildhall School of Music and Drama in 2020.

== Career ==
Fairn made her debut television role as Casey in BBC One police drama The Responder starring Martin Freeman, and broadcast in January 2022.

In 2023, Fairn made her West End debut as Alma in Brokeback Mountain at @sohoplace alongside Lucas Hedges and Mike Faist. Nick Curtis in the Evening Standard wrote Fairn showed "startling assurance" for her debut, and Fiona Mountford for The i said she deserved "plaudits". Fairn also made her feature film debut as Amy in the musical film Chuck Chuck Baby and had a recurring role as Polly Wright in the Sky One political thriller COBRA. She appeared in an episode of the BBC One series Rain Dogs and "Demon 79", an installment of the sixth series of the Netflix anthology Black Mirror.

The following year, Fairn appeared in the Oliver Hermanus directed Sky Atlantic historical drama Mary & George as the maid Jenny and portrayed comedian Laraine Newman in the 2024 biopic Saturday Night. She also appeared in the film Joy.

In 2025, Fairn starred as Anne Guinness in the Netflix historical drama House of Guinness. She also had a role in the historical film The Choral as Bella.

== Personal life ==
As of 2025, Fairn lives in Islington, North London with her boyfriend. She adopted a puppy from Romania.

== Filmography ==
Key
†	Denotes works that have not yet been released

=== Film ===
Year	Title	Role	Notes
2023	Chuck Chuck Baby	Amy	
2024	Joy	Lily	
2024	Saturday Night	Laraine Newman	
2025	The Choral	Bella	
TBA	The Man Who Stole Portugal		

=== Television ===
Year	Title	Role	Notes
2022–2024	The Responder	Casey	10 episodes
2023	Rain Dogs	Frida	Episode: "Jesus Loves a Hustler"
2023	Black Mirror	Suzie	Episode: "Demon 79"
2023	COBRA	Polly Wright	4 episodes
2024	Mary & George	Jenny	6 episodes
2025–present	House of Guinness	Anne Guinness	Main role
2026	It Gets Worse	Abi	6 episodes

== Stage ==
Year	Title	Role	Notes
2023	Brokeback Mountain	Alma	@sohoplace, London
