= Arthur Guinness, Baron Ardilaun =

Irish businessman, politician and philanthropist

The Right Honourable The Lord Ardilaun JP DL
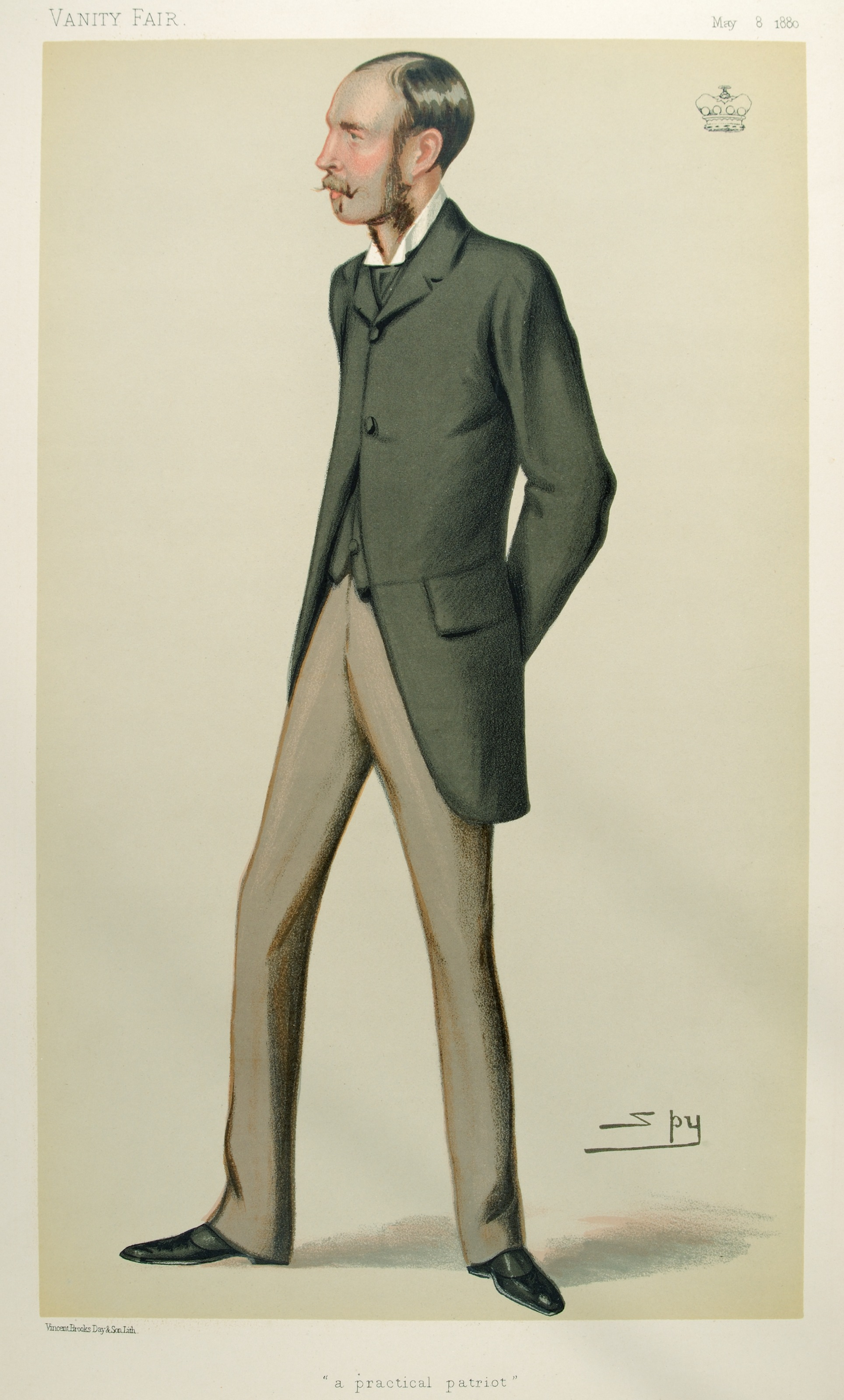
- "A practical patriot". Caricature of the newly created Baron Ardilaun by 'Spy' published in Vanity Fair in 1880.

Member of Parliament for Dublin City
- In office 1 June 1868 – 14 June 1869 Serving with Jonathan Pim
- Preceded by: Benjamin Guinness
- Succeeded by: Dominic Corrigan
- In office 31 January 1874 – 24 March 1880 Serving with Maurice Brooks
- Preceded by: Dominic Corrigan
- Succeeded by: Robert Dyer Lyons

Member of the House of Lords
- Lord Temporal
- Hereditary peerage 26 April 1880 – 20 January 1915

Personal details
- Born: 1 November 1840 Dublin, Ireland
- Died: 20 January 1915 (aged 74) Raheny, Ireland
- Spouse: Lady Olivia Charlotte Hedges-White (m. 1871)
- Parent(s): Sir Benjamin Guinness, 1st Baronet (father); Elizabeth Guinness (mother)

Arthur Edward Guinness, Baron Ardilaun, JP, DL (1 November 1840 – 20 January 1915), styled Sir Arthur Guinness, Bt, between 1868 and 1880, was an Anglo-Irish businessman, politician and philanthropist. He is perhaps best known for giving St Stephen's Green to the Dublin Corporation for public use.

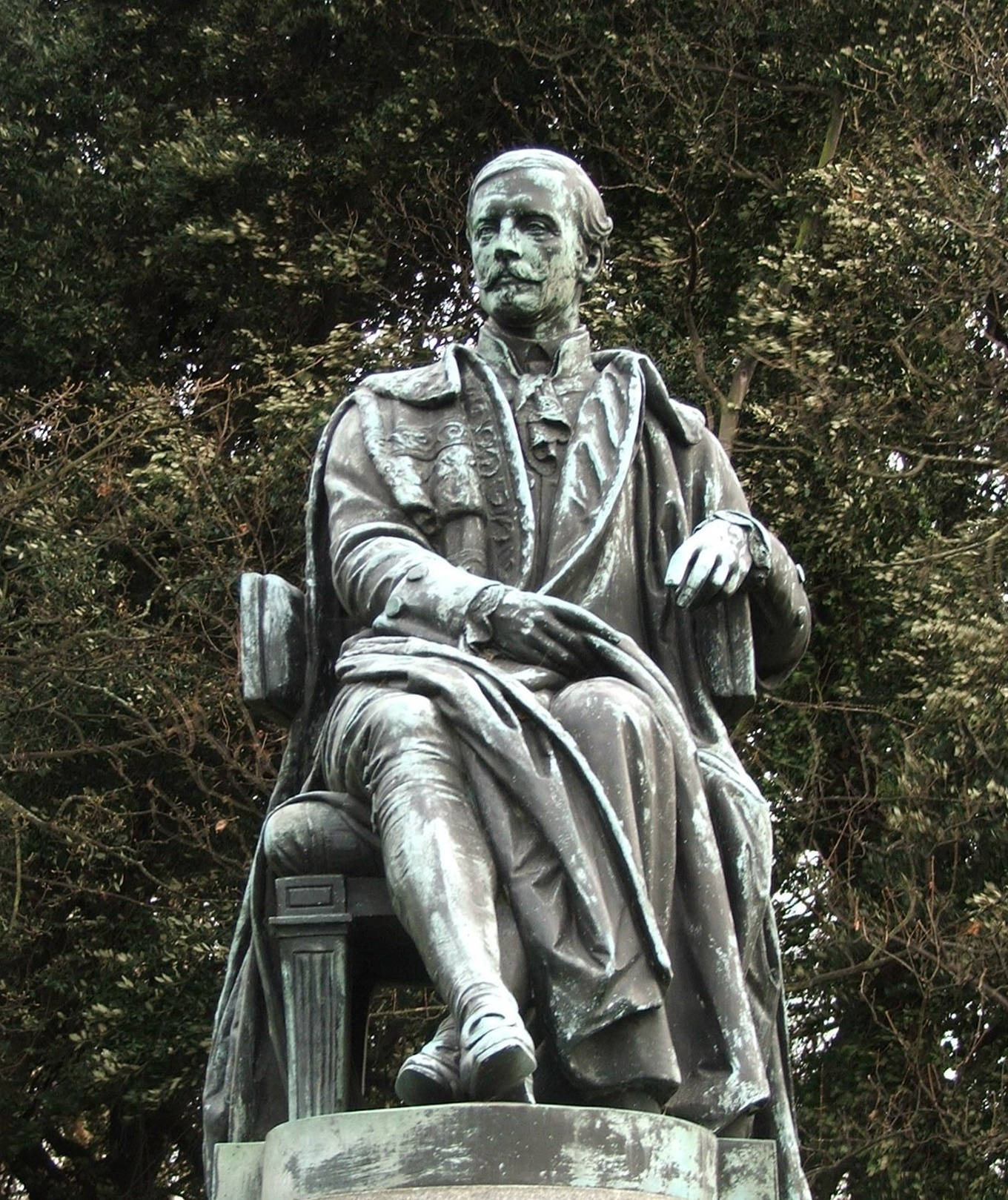
Statue of Lord Ardilaun in St Stephen's Green

== Early life and education ==
Guinness was born at St Anne's, Raheny, Dublin, the eldest son of Sir Benjamin Guinness, 1st Baronet, and elder brother of Edward Cecil Guinness, who was later created the 1st Earl of Iveagh. Arthur Guinness was the great-grandson of the original Arthur Guinness. He was educated at Eton and Trinity College, Dublin (TCD), where he graduated BA in 1862, and in 1868 succeeded his father as the second Baronet Guinness of Ashford.

== Political life ==
In 1868, Guinness was elected Conservative Member of Parliament for the City of Dublin, a seat he held for only a year. His election was voided because of his election agent's unlawful efforts, which the court found were unknown to him. He was re-elected at the next election in 1874.

A supporter of Disraeli's "one nation" conservatism, his politics were typical of "constructive unionism", the belief that the union between Ireland and Britain should be more beneficial to the people of Ireland after centuries of difficulties. In 1872 he was a sponsor of the "Irish Exhibition" at Earlsfort Terrace in Dublin, which was arranged to promote Irish trade. Correcting a mistake about the exhibition in the Freeman's Journal led to a death threat from a religious extremist, which he did not report to the police. In the 1890s he supported the Irish Unionist Alliance.

After withdrawing from the Guinness company in 1876, when he sold his half-share to his brother Edward for £600,000, he was in 1880 raised to the peerage as Baron Ardilaun, of Ashford in the County of Galway. His home there was at Ashford Castle on Lough Corrib, and his title derived from the Gaelic Ard Oileáin, a 'high island' on the lake.

== Landlord ==
In 1852, Sir Benjamin Lee Guinness, 1st Baronet (1798–1868), heir to the Guinness brewery fortune and father of Arthur Guinness, "acquired several Connacht estates that were up for sale in the Encumbered Estates' Court. He bought the Ashford Estate from the Baron Oranmore and Browne, the Doon Estate from Sir Richard O'Donnell, the Cong Estate from Alexander Lambert, part of the Rosshill Estate from Lords Charlemont and Leitrim, and parts of Connemara from Christopher St George. In 1859, he bought Kylemore from a banking consortium. With these purchases, Sir Benjamin Guinness became landlord to 670 tenants, 316 of whom rented at less than £5 per annum. With his father’s death in 1868, Sir Arthur Guinness, 2nd Baronet and oldest son and heir, continued in his father’s footsteps, purchasing vast swaths of County Galway. "He bought the Elwood estate of Strandhill, just across the river from Ashford, Cong, in 1871, and Lord Kilmaine sold him the Inishdoorus islands on Lough Corrib, and lands in the barony of Ross, part of Nymphsfield near Cong in 1875. William Burke of Lisloughry was his agent". When Sir Arthur's acquisitions were combined with those of his father, total acreage for the Ashford Estate was 33,298, with the result that the future Lord Ardilaun owned most of County Galway between Maam (Maum) Bridge and Lough Mask.

Owning 31,000 acres recently bought by his father or himself in Counties Galway and Mayo, Lord Ardilaun, as he became in 1880, was placed in a difficult and unusual position during the Land War of the 1880s. Tenant farmers had started rent strikes and boycotting against absentee landlords who cared little about their estates. In contrast, Ardilaun lived at Ashford Castle for much of the year, and invested heavily in his lands, but was forced to sell land from the 1880s and saw two of his bailiffs assassinated in what became known as the Lough Mask Murders, in January 1882. His attempt to preserve the landscape at Muckross, near Killarney, County Kerry, from 1899 for aesthetic reasons was under challenge as soon as 1905. With the Digby family, he was a joint owner of the Aran Islands that were compulsorily purchased by the Congested Districts Board (CDB) in 1916.

== Philanthropy ==
Lord Ardilaun was, like many in the Guinness family, a generous philanthropist, devoting himself to a number of public causes, including the restoration of Marsh's Library in Dublin and the extension of the city's Coombe Women's Hospital. In buying and keeping intact the estate around Muckross House in 1899, he assisted the movement to preserve the lake and mountain landscape around Killarney, now a major tourist destination. From 1875 he was a sponsor of the Dublin Artisans' Dwellings Company, which built cottages for poor Dubliners at reasonable rents, and was the forerunner of the Iveagh Trust later set up by his brother Edward.

In his best-known achievement, he also bought, landscaped, and gave to the capital, the central public park of St Stephen's Green, where the statue of him commissioned by the city can be seen opposite the Royal College of Surgeons. To do so he sponsored a Private bill that was passed as the Saint Stephen’s Green (Dublin) Act 1877, and after the landscaping it was formally opened to the public on 27 July 1880. It has been maintained since then by the Commissioners of Public Works in Ireland (now the Office of Public Works)

In 1913 Ardilaun was approached by Sir Hugh Lane, who wanted to build a new modern art gallery in the Green where the statue of Lord Ardilaun was placed. Ardilaun replied:

"Are you mad? I will not have myself stand sentry to a picture palace like some giddy huckster".

An intermission in Ardilaun's philanthropy provoked Yeats's powerful poem "To a Wealthy Man...."

He was also elected President of the Royal Dublin Society from 1892 to 1913.

== In Ulysses ==
Ulysses by James Joyce includes several references to Ardilaun, as Joyce considered him to be a prime Irish example of Victorian conventional respectability. The porter brewed by the "cunning brothers"—he and his brother Lord Iveagh—was: "a crystal cup full of the foamy ebon ale which the noble twin brothers Bungiveagh and Bungardilaun brew ever in their divine alevats, cunning as the sons of deathless Leda. For they garner the succulent berries of the hop and mass and sift and bruise and brew them and they mix therewith sour juices and bring the must to the sacred fire and cease not night or day from their toil, those cunning brothers, lords of the vat." In the "Nighttown" section, the breasts of a girl who is undressing are "Two ardilauns", meaning "two high islands", a play on the Gaelic meaning of the word.

In 1902–03 Joyce also wrote literary reviews in the Irish Daily Express which was owned by Ardilaun.

== Personal life ==
Arms of Lord Ardilaun : Quarterly, 1st and 4th, Per saltire Gules and Azure a Lion rampant Or on a Chief Ermine a Dexter Hand couped at the wrist of the first, a crescent for difference (for Guinness); 2nd and 3rd, Argent on a Fess between three Crescents Sable a Trefoil slipped Or (for Lee)

In 1871, the then Sir Arthur Guinness, 2nd Bt. (the future Lord Ardilaun), married Lady Olivia Charlotte Hedges-White, daughter of The 3rd Earl of Bantry, whose family seat was Bantry House in County Cork; the couple had no children.

Lord Ardilaun died on 20 January 1915 at his home at St Anne's, Raheny, and was buried at All Saints Church, Raheny, whose construction he had sponsored. Those present at the funeral included representatives of the Royal Dublin Society (RDS), of which Lord Ardilaun was president for many years, the Royal Horticultural Society of Ireland, the Irish Unionist Alliance, and the Primrose League. His barony became extinct at his death, but the baronetcy devolved upon his nephew Algernon Arthur St. Lawrence Lee Guinness.

On his widow's death, Saint Anne's Park passed to Algernon's cousin, The Rt. Rev. Benjamin Plunket, former Church of Ireland Bishop of Meath, who sold most of the estate to Dublin Corporation in 1937, keeping Sybil Hill as his residence. The corporation has preserved much of the estate as one of Dublin's most important public parks, though the house itself burnt down in 1943, with the remaining lands used for housing. The outcome of Ardilaun's extensive tree plantings came into focus a century after his death, when in 2019 the park was given Green Flag status and was listed as one of the world's top five urban public parks.

== In popular culture ==
Ardilaun is portrayed by Irish actor Anthony Boyle in the Netflix television series House of Guinness.

== Sources ==
- Wilson, Derek. Dark and Light Weidenfeld, London 1998. ISBN 0-297-81718-3.
- Saint Stephen's Green (Dublin) Act; enacted 1877

Parliament of the United Kingdom
Preceded by Sir Benjamin Guinness, Bt; Jonathan Pim	Member of Parliament for Dublin; 1868–1870; With: Jonathan Pim	Succeeded by Jonathan Pim; Sir Dominic Corrigan, Bt
Preceded by Jonathan Pim; Sir Dominic Corrigan, Bt	Member of Parliament for Dublin; 1874–1880; With: Maurice Brooks	Succeeded by Maurice Brooks; Robert Dyer Lyons
Baronetage of the United Kingdom
Preceded by Benjamin Guinness	Baronet (of Ashford); 1868–1915	Succeeded by Algernon Guinness
Peerage of the United Kingdom
New creation	Baron Ardilaun; 1880–1915	Extinct
