= Benjamin Guinness =

Irish brewer and philanthropist (1798–1868)

Sir Benjamin Guinness Bt JP DL
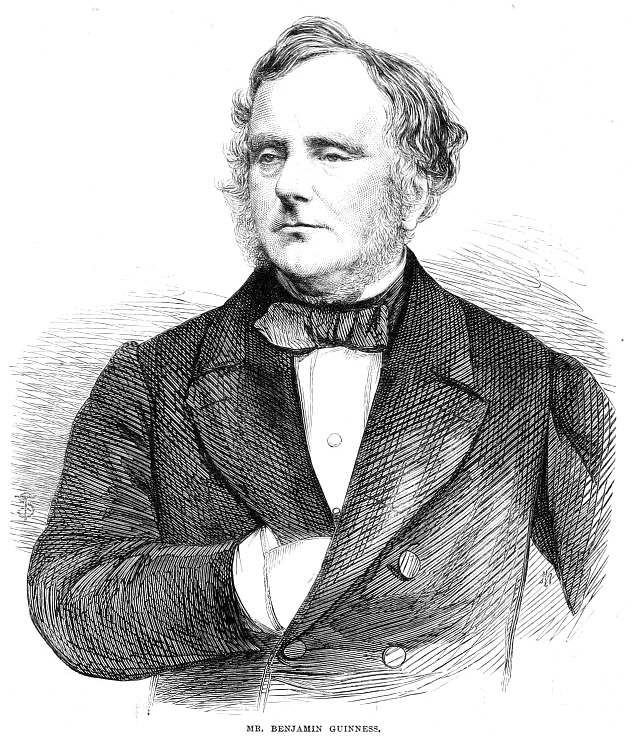
- Guinness in 1865

Member of Parliament for Dublin City
- In office 1865–1868
- Preceded by: Sir Edward Grogan; John Vance
- Succeeded by: Jonathan Pim; Sir Arthur Guinness

Lord Mayor of Dublin
- In office 1851–1852
- Preceded by: John Reynolds
- Succeeded by: John D'Arcy

Personal details
- Born: 1 November 1798 Dublin, Ireland
- Died: 19 May 1868 (aged 69) London, England
- Party: Irish Conservative Party
- Spouse: Elizabeth Guinness (m. 1837)
- Children: Anne, Arthur, Benjamin and Edward
- Parent: Arthur Guinness II (father)
- Relatives: Arthur Guinness (grandfather)

Sir Benjamin Lee Guinness, 1st Baronet (1 November 1798 – 19 May 1868), was an Anglo-Irish brewer and philanthropist.

== Brewer ==
Benjamin Lee Guinness was born on 1 November 1798 in Dublin, Ireland. He was the third son of the second Arthur Guinness, and his wife Anne Lee, and a grandson of the first Arthur, who had founded the St. James's Gate Brewery in 1759. He joined his father in the business in his late teens, without attending university, and from 1839 he took sole control within the family. From 1855, when his father died, Guinness had become the wealthiest man in Ireland, having built up a considerable export trade and by continually enlarging his brewery.

In numbers, sales of his single and double stouts had been 78,000 hogsheads in 1855, which he nearly trebled to 206,000 hogsheads in 1865. Of these, some 112,000 were sold in Ireland, as the rural economy recovered from the Great Famine of the 1840s, and 94,000 were exported to Britain. By 1870, soon after his death, sales had risen further to 256,000 hogsheads, of which 120,000 were exported to Britain. Benjamin had also created the capacity for his sons to expand sales much further, and by 1879 these reached 565,000 hogsheads.

As a part of the brewery expansion, and to ensure deliveries, he invested in the new Irish railway companies from the 1840s. By 1867, the firm owned £86,000-worth of Irish railway stock (worth over £135m in 2013 values, taken as a share of GDP).

== Politician and recognition ==
In 1851, he was elected the first Lord Mayor of Dublin under the reformed local government structures.

In 1863 he was made an honorary LL.D. (Doctor of Laws) by Trinity College Dublin, and on 15 April 1867 was created a baronet by patent, in addition to which, on 18 May 1867, by royal licence, he had a grant of supporters to his family arms.

Guinness was elected to the House of Commons in 1865 as a Conservative representative for Dublin City, serving until his death. His party's leader was Lord Derby. Previously, he had supported the Liberal Lord Palmerston, but in the 1860s, the Liberals proposed higher taxation on drinks such as beer. Before 1865, the Irish Conservative Party did not entirely support British conservative policy, but did so after the Irish Church Act 1869. The government's most notable reform was the Reform Act 1867 that expanded the franchise.

== Philanthropist ==
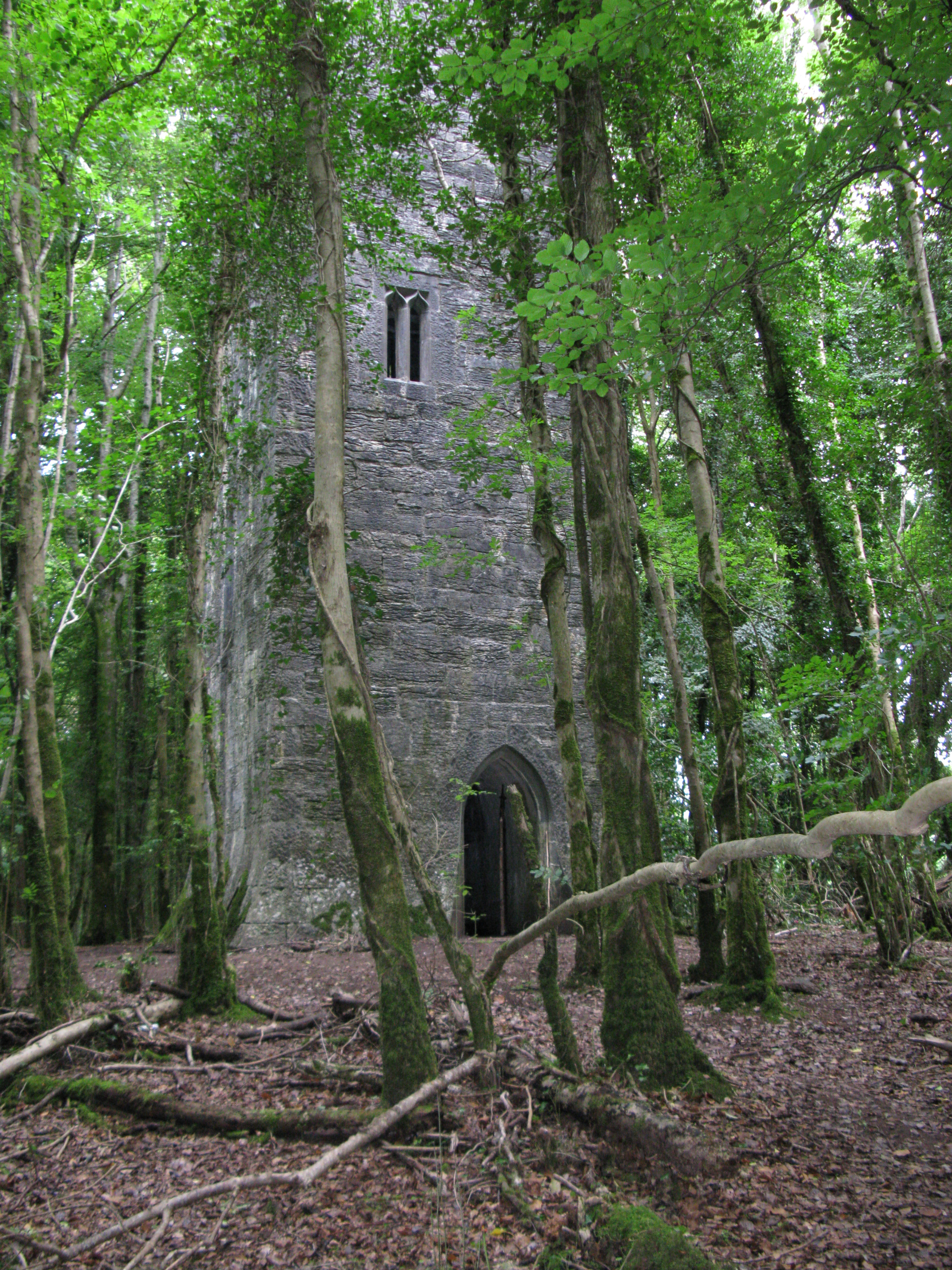
The Guinness Tower on the grounds of Ashford castle, built by Benjamin Guinness in 1864.

From 1860 to 1865, he undertook at his own expense, and without hiring an architect, the restoration of the city's St Patrick's Cathedral, an enterprise that cost him over £150,000. In 1865, the building was restored to the dean and chapter and reopened for services on 24 February. The citizens of Dublin and the dean and chapter of St. Patrick's presented him with addresses on 31 December 1865, expressive of their gratitude for what he had done for the city. The addresses were in two volumes, which were afterwards exhibited at the Paris Exhibition of 1867.

In recognition of his generosity, he was made a baronet in 1867. He was one of the ecclesiastical commissioners for Ireland, a governor of Simpson's Hospital, and vice-chairman of the Dublin Exhibition Palace. He showed his practical interest in Irish archæology by carefully preserving the antiquarian remains existing on his large estates around Ashford Castle in County Mayo, which he bought in 1855. Nearby Cong Abbey was well-known, and the famous Cross of Cong had been moved to a Dublin museum in 1839.

He died in 1868 at his Park Lane London home. At the time of his death, he was engaged in the restoration of Archbishop Marsh's public library, a building which adjoins St. Patrick's Cathedral, a project completed by his son Arthur.

== Family ==
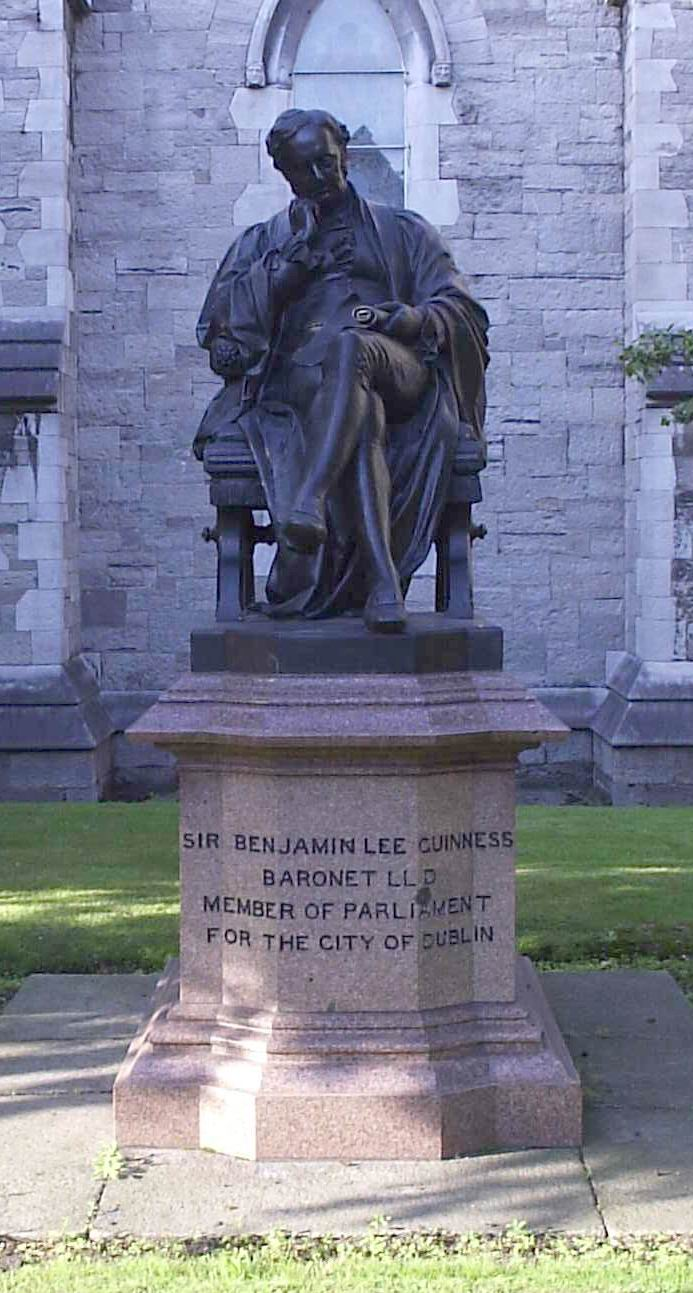
Statue of Benjamin Guinness in the grounds of St Patrick's Cathedral, Dublin

On 24 February 1837, he married his first cousin Elizabeth Guinness, the third daughter of Edward Guinness of Dublin. They had three sons and a daughter, and lived at Beaumont House, Beaumont, then north of the city in County Dublin. In 1856, he bought what is now Iveagh House at 80 St Stephen's Green. His Ashford Castle home was described in William Wilde's book on Lough Corrib in the 1860s.

He was succeeded in the baronetcy by his eldest son, Arthur, who took over the brewery with his brother, the third son, Edward. His second son, Benjamin, married Lady Henrietta St Lawrence, daughter of Thomas St Lawrence, 3rd Earl of Howth; they moved to England, where he was a captain in the Royal Horse Guards. His daughter Anne married William, Lord Plunket in 1863. The present-day Guinness Baronets descend from his second son Benjamin, with their son Algernon Arthur St. Lawrence Lee Guinness (1883–1954) becoming Sir Algernon, 3rd Baronet on the death of his childless uncle, Lord Ardilaun in 1915.

He was buried in Mount Jerome Cemetery, Dublin, in the family vault, on 27 May. His personalty was sworn under £1,100,000 on 8 August 1868.

A bronze statue of him by John Foley was erected by the Cathedral Chapter in St. Patrick's churchyard, on the south side of the cathedral, in September 1875; it was restored in 2006.

Parliament of the United Kingdom
Preceded by Sir Edward Grogan; John Vance	Member of Parliament for Dublin City; 1865–1868; With: Jonathan Pim	Succeeded by Jonathan Pim; Sir Arthur Guinness
Baronetage of the United Kingdom
New title	Baronet (of Ashford); 1867–1868	Succeeded by Arthur Edward Guinness
Civic offices
Preceded by John Reynolds	Lord Mayor of Dublin; 1851–1852	Succeeded by John D'Arcy
