= Edward Guinness, 1st Earl of Iveagh =

Irish businessman and philanthropist (1847–1927)

The Right Honourable The Earl of Iveagh KP GCVO FRS
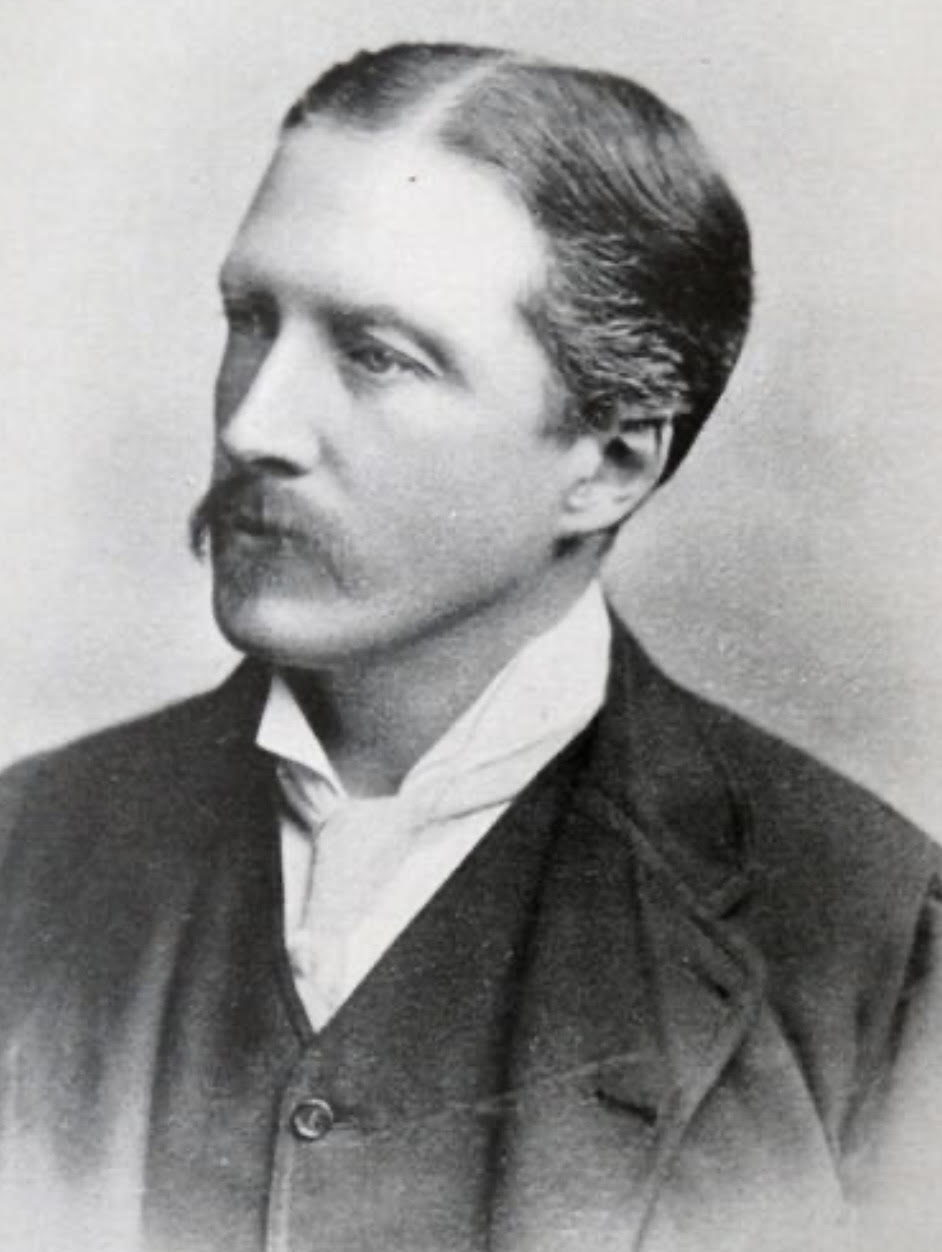
- The 1st Earl of Iveagh

Member of the House of Lords
- Lord Temporal
- In office 20 January 1891 – 7 October 1927
- Preceded by: Peerage created
- Succeeded by: The 2nd Earl of Iveagh

Personal details
- Born: Edward Cecil Guinness; 10 November 1847 Clontarf, Dublin, Ireland
- Died: 7 October 1927 (aged 79) Grosvenor Place, London, England
- Resting place: Elveden, Suffolk
- Party: Irish Unionist Alliance
- Spouse: Adelaide Guinness (m. 1873; died 1916)
- Children: Rupert Guinness, 2nd Earl of Iveagh; Ernest Guinness; Walter Guinness, 1st Baron Moyne
- Parent(s): Sir Benjamin Guinness, 1st Baronet; Elizabeth Guinness
- Education: Trinity College Dublin

Edward Cecil Guinness, 1st Earl of Iveagh, KP, GCVO, FRS (10 November 1847 – 7 October 1927), known between May 1885 and January 1891 as Sir Edward Cecil Guinness, 1st Baronet, was an Anglo-Irish businessman and philanthropist. A member of the prominent Guinness family, he was the head of the family's eponymous brewing business, making him the richest person in Ireland. A prominent philanthropist, he is best remembered for his provision of affordable housing in London and Dublin through charitable trusts.

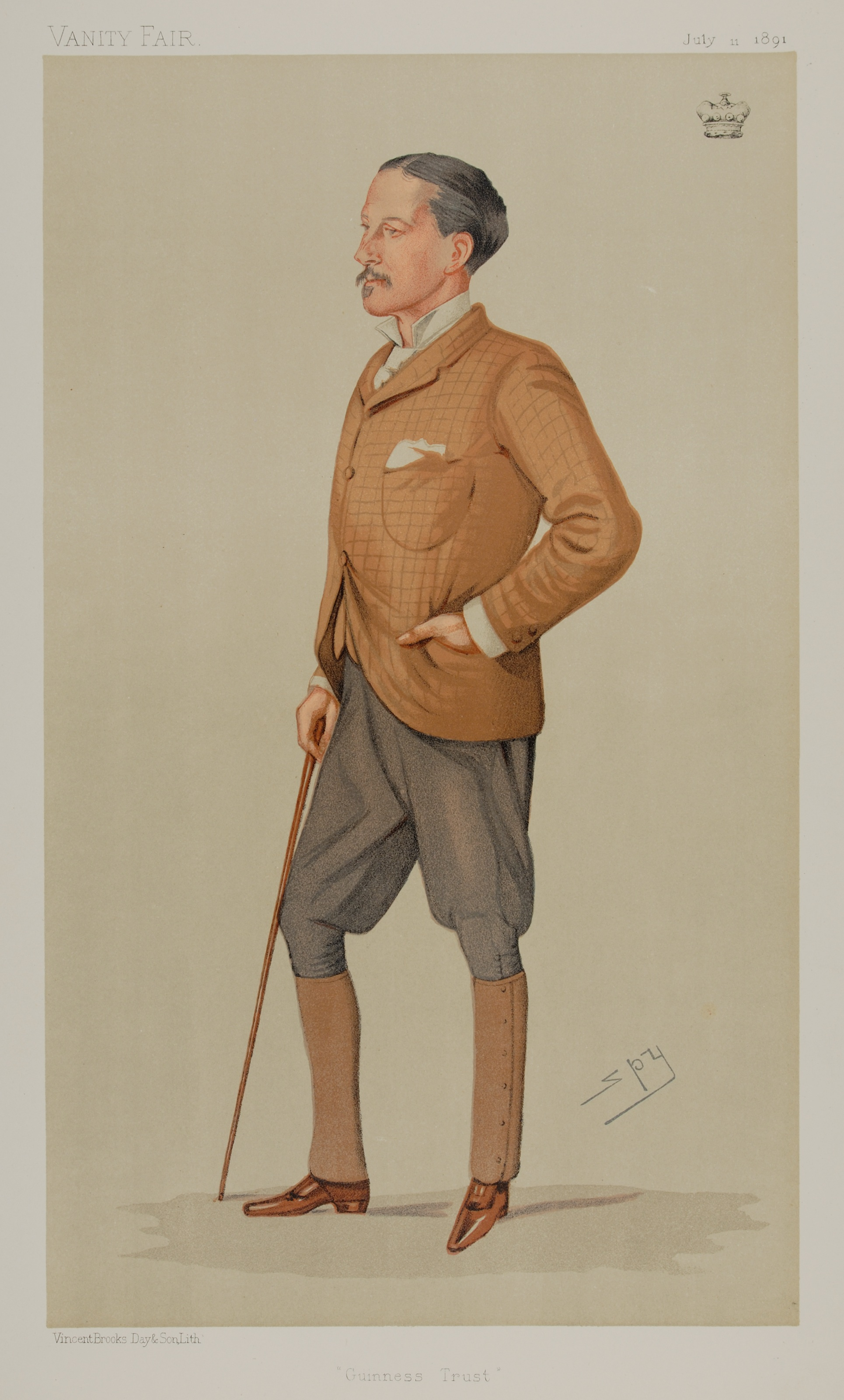
"Guinness Trust". Caricature by Spy published in Vanity Fair in 1891

== Public life ==
Born at St. Anne's in Clontarf, Dublin, Guinness was the third son of Sir Benjamin Guinness, 1st Baronet, and younger brother of Arthur Guinness, Baron Ardilaun. He was educated by private tutor before entering Trinity College Dublin, where he graduated with BA in 1870 and MA in 1872. He was High Sheriff of Dublin City in 1876 and of the county in 1885. That same year, he was created a baronet of Castleknock, County Dublin, for helping with the visit of Edward, Prince of Wales to Ireland. In 1891, Guinness was created Baron Iveagh, of Iveagh in County Down. He was appointed a Knight of St Patrick (KP) in 1895, and ten years later was advanced in the Peerage of the United Kingdom to Viscount Iveagh. He was appointed Honorary Colonel of the Dublin City Artillery Militia in 1899. Elected to the Royal Society in 1906, he was two years later elected nineteenth Chancellor of the University of Dublin in 1908–1927, he served as a vice-president of the Royal Dublin Society from 1906 to 1927. In 1910 he was appointed GCVO on the occasion of the King's visit to Elveden. In 1919, he was created Earl of Iveagh and Viscount Elveden, of Elveden in the County of Suffolk.

== Business ==
Lord Iveagh was managing director of the Guinness partnership and company, from his father's death in 1868 until 1889, running the largest brewery in the world - it spanned 64 acres (26 ha). He later became chairman of the board for life.

By the age of 29 he had taken over sole ownership of the Dublin brewery after buying out the half-share of his older brother Lord Ardilaun for £600,000 in 1876. Over the next 10 years, Guinness brought unprecedented success to St James's Gate, multiplying the value of his brewery enormously. By 1879 he was brewing 565,000 hogsheads of stout. Seven years later, in 1886, he was selling 635,000 hogsheads in Ireland, 212,000 in Britain, and 60,000 elsewhere, a total of 907,000 hogsheads.

He then became the richest man in Ireland after floating two-thirds of the company in 1886 on the London Stock Exchange for £6 million before retiring a multi-millionaire at the age of 40. He remained chairman of the new public company Guinness, and was its largest shareholder, retaining about 35% of the stock. The amount can be compared to the 1886 GDP of the UK, which was £116 million. By 1914 the brewery's output had doubled again from the 1886 level, to 1,877,000 hogsheads.

In 1902 he commissioned the Guinness Storehouse, that is today one of Ireland's main tourist attractions.

== Public housing ==
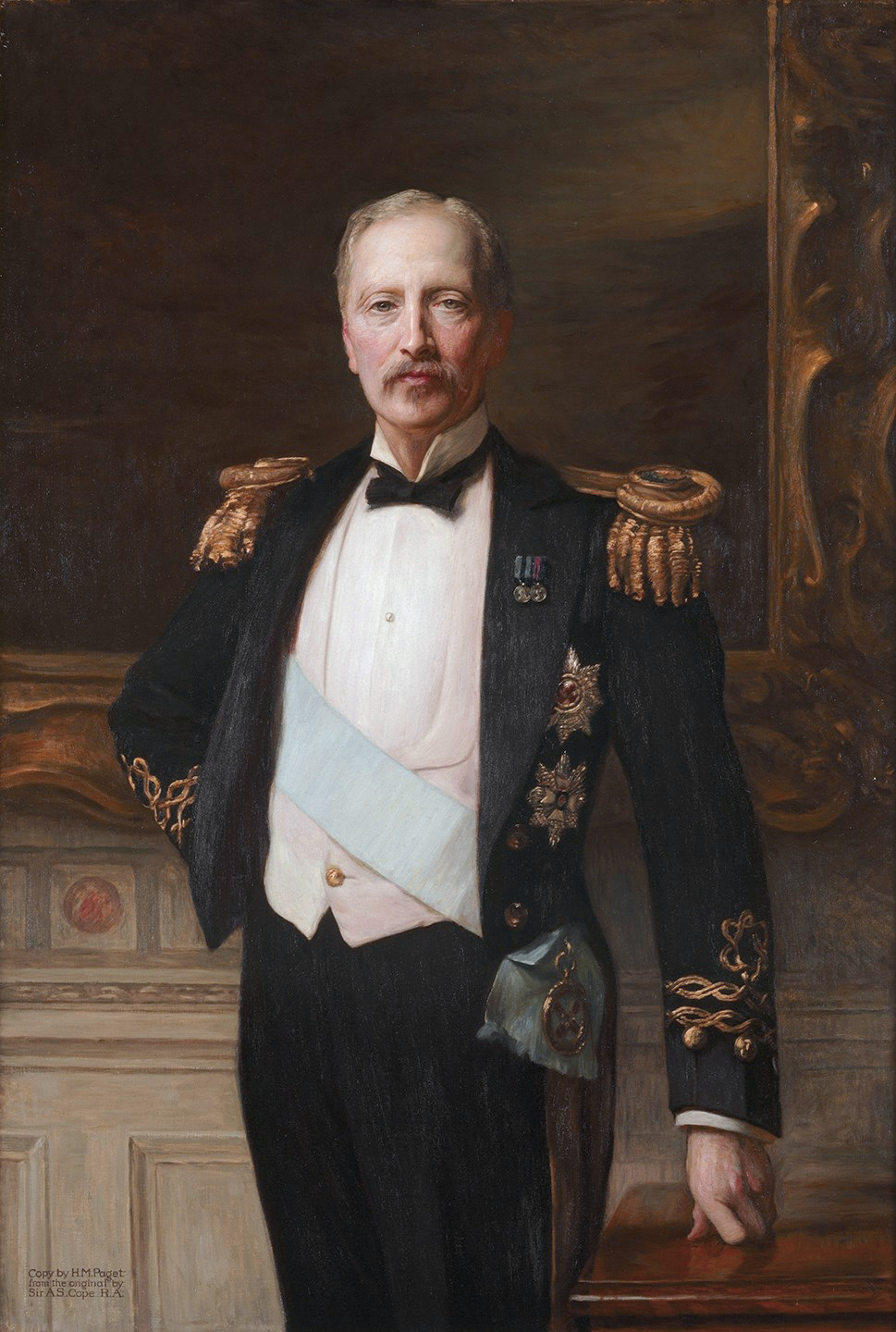
Edward Cecil Guinness, 1st Earl of Iveagh (after Arthur Stockdale Cope)

Like his father and brother, Lord Iveagh was a generous philanthropist and contributed almost £1 million to slum clearance and housing projects, among other causes. In London this was the 'Guinness Trust', founded in 1890, that at present manages "over 66,000 homes". Most of his aesthetic and philanthropic legacy to Dublin is still intact. The Dublin branch of the Guinness Trust became the Iveagh Trust in 1903, by a local act of Parliament, the Iveagh Trust Act 1903 (3 Edw. 7. c. iii), which funded the largest area of urban renewal in Edwardian Dublin, and still provides over 10% of the social housing in central Dublin. In 1908 he gave the large back garden of his house at 80 St. Stephens Green in central Dublin, known as the "Iveagh Gardens", to the new University College Dublin, which is now a public park. Previously he had bought and cleared some slums on the north side of St Patrick's Cathedral and in 1901 he created the public gardens known as "St. Patrick's Park". In nearby Francis Street he built the Iveagh Market to enable street traders to sell produce out of the rain.

Iveagh was portrayed as "Guinness Trust" in a "Spy" cartoon in July 1891.

== Medical and scientific research ==
Iveagh also donated £250,000 to the Lister Institute in 1898, the first medical research charity in the United Kingdom (to be modelled on the Pasteur Institute, studying infectious diseases). In 1908, he co-funded the Radium Institute in London. He also sponsored new physics and botany buildings in Trinity College Dublin in 1903, and part-funded the students' residence at Trinity Hall, Dartry, in 1908.

Iveagh helped finance the British Antarctic Expedition (1907–09), and Mount Iveagh, a mountain in the Supporters Range in Antarctica, is named for him.

== Art collector ==
Interested in fine art all his life, from the 1870s Guinness amassed a distinguished collection of Old Master paintings, antique furniture and historic textiles. In the late 1880s he was a client of Joe Duveen, buying screens and furniture; Duveen realised that he was spending much more on fine art at Agnew's, and refocused his own business on art sales. He later recalled Guinness as a: "stocky gentleman with a marked Irish brogue".

While he was furnishing his London home at Hyde Park Corner, after he had retired, Iveagh began building his art collection in earnest. Much of his collection of paintings was donated to the nation after his death in 1927 and is housed at the Iveagh Bequest at Kenwood, Hampstead, north London. While this lays claim to much of his collection of paintings, it is Farmleigh that best displays his taste in architecture as well as his tastes in antique furniture and textiles. Iveagh was also a patron of then-current artists such as the British portraitist Henry Keyworth Raine

== Political life ==
Iveagh's father had sat as a Conservative MP for Dublin in the 1860s, as did his brother Arthur in the 1870s. Iveagh limited his involvement to acting as High Sheriff of County Dublin in 1885, mindful of the growing movement towards Irish Home Rule in the 1880s and the growth of the electorate under the 1884 Act. He did however stand as a Conservative for Dublin St Stephen's Green in the 1885 general election, losing to the Irish Parliamentary Party candidate.

Given his wealth he preferred to effect social improvements himself, and sought a seat in the House of Lords, which he achieved in 1891. He supported the Irish Unionist Alliance. In 1913 he refused to lock out his workforce during the Dublin Lockout. In 1917–18, he took part in the ill-fated Irish Convention that attempted find a moderate solution to the Irish nationalists' demands. Though opposed to Sinn Féin, he had a personal friendship with W. T. Cosgrave, who emerged as the first leader of the Irish Free State in 1922.

Like many others in the Irish business world, he had feared that Irish Home Rule would result in new taxes or customs duties between Dublin and Britain, his largest market. The existing free trade within the United Kingdom of Great Britain and Ireland would likely turn protectionist, causing a loss of sales, employment and profits. In the event, the new Free State increased the tax on sales within Ireland, but not on exports.

== Sporting interests ==
On land, Iveagh's favourite hobby was to drive a coach-and-four (horses), a very physical activity, occasionally driving from Dublin to the Punchestown Racecourse about 20 miles away, and back. He also was a keen yachtsman, and in 1897 he won a race between England and Kiel that was sponsored by Kaiser Wilhelm. A member of several clubs including the Royal St. George Yacht Club, his main boat was the 204-ton schooner "Cetonia" which he bought in 1880, making frequent appearances at Cowes Week until 1914.

== Record estate ==
After his death in 1927 at Grosvenor Place, London, Iveagh was buried at Elveden, Suffolk. His estate was assessed for probate at £13,486,146 16s. 2d. (roughly equivalent to £732,509,958 in 2025). This remained a British record until the death of Sir John Ellerman in 1933. Although probate was sought in Britain, a part of the death duties was paid to the new Irish Free State. His will bequeathed Kenwood House in Hampstead to the nation as a museum for his art collection, known as the "Iveagh Bequest".

In 1936 his family installed the "Iveagh Window" in his memory, in the north transept of St Patrick's Cathedral, Dublin. The window was designed and made by Sir Frank Brangwyn.

In 1939, Lord Iveagh's sons gave his Dublin home at 80 St. Stephen's Green to the Irish Government, and it was renamed Iveagh House. Since then it has been the home of the Department of Foreign Affairs and Trade, and "Iveagh House" has become the metonym of the department.

== Family ==
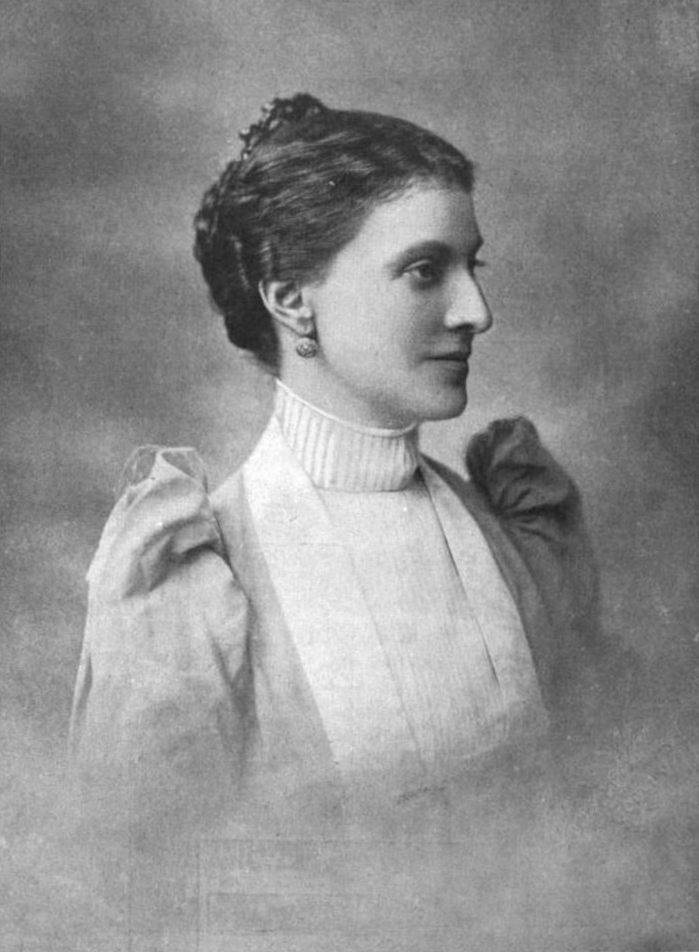
Adelaide, Viscountess Iveagh

In 1873, Iveagh married his third cousin Adelaide Maria Guinness (1844–1916), nicknamed "Dodo". She was descended from the banking line of the Guinness family, and was the daughter of Richard Guinness, barrister and MP, and his wife Katherine, a daughter of Sir Charles Jenkinson, 10th Baronet.

Adelaide's most famous portrait was painted circa 1885 by George Elgar Hicks. They had three sons:

- Rupert Edward Cecil Lee Guinness, 2nd Earl of Iveagh (1874–1967)
- Hon. (Arthur) Ernest Guinness (1876–1949)
- Walter Edward Guinness, 1st Baron Moyne (1880–1944)

== In popular culture ==
Iveagh is portrayed by English actor Louis Partridge in the Netflix television series House of Guinness.

== Arms ==
Coat of arms of Edward Guinness, 1st Earl of Iveagh
Earl of Iveagh	Coronet A Coronet of an Earl Crest 1st: A Boar passant quarterly Or and Gules; 2nd: On a Pillar Argent encircled by a Ducal Coronet Or an Eagle preying on a Bird's Leg erased proper Escutcheon Quarterly: 1st and 4th, Per saltire Gules and Azure a Lion rampant Or on a Chief Ermine a Dexter Hand couped at the wrist of the first (Guinness); 2nd and 3rd, Argent on a Fess between three Crescents Sable a Trefoil slipped Or (Lee) Supporters On either side a Stag Gules collared gemel and attired Or each resting a hind hoof upon an Escutcheon Vert charged with a Lion rampant Or Motto Spes Mea In Deo (My hope is in God)

== See also ==
- Elveden Hall – Stately home in Suffolk, England
- Farmleigh – State guest house and estate in Dublin, Ireland
- Guinness family

== Bibliography ==
- G. Martelli, Man of his time (London 1957).
- D. Wilson, Dark and Light (Weidenfeld, London 1998).
- J. Guinness, Requiem for a family business (Macmillan, London 1997).
- S. Dennison and O.MacDonagh, Guinness 1886-1939 From incorporation to the Second World War (Cork University Press 1998).
- F. Aalen, The Iveagh Trust The first hundred years 1890-1990 (Dublin 1990).
- J. Bryant, Kenwood: The Iveagh Bequest (English Heritage publication 2004)
- Joyce, J. The Guinnesses (Poolbeg Press, Dublin 2009)
- Bourke, Edward J. The Guinness Story: The Family, the Business and the Black Stuff (O'Brien Press, 2009). ISBN 978-1-84717-145-0

Academic offices
Preceded by 4th Earl of Rosse	Chancellor of the University of Dublin; 1908–1927	Succeeded by 2nd Earl of Iveagh
Baronetage of the United Kingdom
New creation	Baronet (of Castle Knock); 1885–1927	Succeeded by Rupert Guinness
Peerage of the United Kingdom
New creation	Earl of Iveagh; 1919–1927	Succeeded by Rupert Guinness
New creation	Viscount Iveagh; 1905–1927	Succeeded by Rupert Guinness
New creation	Baron Iveagh; 1891–1927	Succeeded by Rupert Guinness
