= Anne Lee Guinness =

Irish philanthropist

The Right Honourable The Baroness Plunket

Personal details
- Born: Anne Lee Guinness; 11 June 1839 Dublin, Ireland
- Died: 8 November 1889 (aged 50) Old Connaught House, Dublin
- Spouse: William Plunket, 4th Baron Plunket
- Children: William Plunket, 5th Baron Plunket; Elizabeth Charlotte Plunket; Benjamin Plunket; Olivia Anne Plunket; Kathleen Louisa Plunket; Ethel Josephine Plunket
- Parents: Sir Benjamin Lee Guinness, 1st Baronet (father); Elizabeth Guinness (mother)

Anne Lee Plunket, Baroness Plunket (née Guinness; 11 June 1839 – 8 November 1889) was an Irish philanthropist.

== Biography ==
Anne Lee Guinness was born in 1839, and was the only daughter of Sir Benjamin Lee Guinness, 1st Baronet. While her father was restoring St Patrick's Cathedral, Dublin, she became involved in causes helping the poor and sick in that area of Dublin, sponsoring bible readings and basic medical supplies. This led to her establishing St Patrick's nursing home in 1876, which became a training centre for Church of Ireland nurses.

Guinness married William Plunket, 4th Baron Plunket on 11 June 1863. The couple had two sons and four daughters, William Plunket, 5th Baron Plunket, Elizabeth Charlotte Plunket, Most Rev. Hon. Benjamin Plunket, Hon. Olivia Anne Plunket, Hon. Kathleen Louisa Plunket, and Hon. Ethel Josephine Plunket. The dowry that Guinness brought to the marriage, £49,000, allowed Plunket to extend their home at Old Connaught House and restore the walled garden.

Her husband supported Guinness' work at St Patrick's, and she in turn assisted in her educational projects including an extension of Alexandra College and the establishment of the Irish Clergy Daughters’ School at Earlsfort Terrace, Dublin. For large portion of her life, Guinness suffered from a degenerative illness, dying at Old Connaught House on 8 November 1889. She is buried at Mount Jerome Cemetery in the Guinness family vault. She is commemorated with a series of stained-glass windows depicting the works of Dorcas in St Patrick's Cathedral.

== In popular culture ==
Guinness is portrayed by English actress Emily Fairn in the Netflix television series House of Guinness.
