= Thomas St Lawrence, 3rd Earl of Howth =

Irish peer

The Right Honourable The Earl of Howth KP
- Born: 16 August 1803
- Died: 4 February 1874 (aged 70)
- Spouses: Emily de Burgh (m. 1826; died 1842) Henrietta Barfoot (m. 1851)
- Children: 8, including Margaret, William, and Henrietta
- Father: William St Lawrence

Thomas St Lawrence, 3rd Earl of Howth KP (16 August 1803 – 4 February 1874) was an Irish peer, styled Viscount St Lawrence until 1822.

== Biography ==
He became Earl of Howth in 1822 on the death of his father, William St Lawrence, 2nd Earl of Howth. His mother was William's second wife Margaret Burke. He was Vice-Admiral of the Coast of Leinster, and was appointed a Knight of the Order of St Patrick on 22 July 1835 and Lord Lieutenant of County Dublin in 1851.

On 9 January 1826, he married Lady Emily, daughter of John de Burgh, 13th Earl of Clanricarde and Elizabeth Burke. She died of measles in 1842 in Dublin. On 27 February 1851, he married Henrietta Elizabeth Digby Barfoot (d. 5 March 1884) of Midlington House, Hampshire, daughter of Peter Barfoot and Henrietta Digby. When he died in the south of France in 1874, he was succeeded by his son by his first marriage, William.

== Family ==
=== With Lady Emily de Burgh ===
- Lady Emily St. Lawrence
- Lady Catherine Elizabeth St. Lawrence
- Lady Mary St. Lawrence
- Lady Margaret Frances St. Lawrence
- William Ulick Tristram St. Lawrence, 4th Earl of Howth

=== With Henriette Elizabeth Digby Barfoot ===
- Lady Geraldine Digby St. Lawrence
- Lady Henrietta Eliza St. Lawrence
- Captain Hon. Thomas Kenelm Digby St. Lawrence

Honorary titles
Preceded by The Earl of Meath	Lord Lieutenant of County Dublin; 1851–1874	Succeeded by The Viscount Monck
Peerage of Ireland
Preceded by William St Lawrence	Earl of Howth; 1822–1874	Succeeded by William St Lawrence
