= Athenaeum =

Athenaeum or atheneum may refer to:

== Books and periodicals ==
- Athenaeum (German magazine), a journal of German Romanticism, established 1798
- The Athenaeum (British magazine), a weekly London literary magazine 1828–1921
- The Athenaeum (Acadia University), a student newspaper of Acadia University, Nova Scotia
- The Daily Athenaeum, the newspaper of West Virginia University
- The Athenaeum (novel), a novel by Raul Pompéia 1888
- Atheneum Books, a New York publisher, now an imprint of Simon & Schuster
- Athenaeum Press, the Cambridge, Massachusetts, building where Ginn and Company printed books

== Clubs and societies ==
- Marian Miner Cook Athenaeum, Claremont McKenna College, Claremont, California, US
- Liverpool Athenaeum, Liverpool, UK
- Athenaeum Club, London, UK
- German Athenaeum, London, UK
- Ateneo de Madrid, Spain
- Manchester Athenaeum, Manchester, UK
- Athenaeum Club, Melbourne, Australia
- Athenaeum at Caltech, California Institute of Technology, Pasadena, California, US
- The Plymouth Athenaeum, Plymouth, UK
- Ateneo de Sevilla, Spain

== Cultural centers ==
- Athenæum (Das Deutsche Haus), Indianapolis, Indiana, US
- Ateneu Alguerès, Alghero, Sardinia, Italy
- The Athenaeum (Camden Road), London
- The Athenaeum (South Africa), Port Elizabeth, South Africa
- Boston Athenaeum, Boston, Massachusetts, US
- Caracas Athenaeum, Caracas, Venezuela
- Mexican Youth Athenaeum, Mexico City, Mexico
- New Harmony's Atheneum, New Harmony, Indiana, US
- Puerto Rican Athenaeum, the English name for Ateneo Puertorriqueño, Puerta de Tierra, Puerto Rico
- Iași Athenaeum, Iași, Romania

== Hotels ==
- The Athenaeum Hotel, Piccadilly, London, UK
- Athenaeum Hotel at the Chautauqua Institution, New York, US

== Libraries ==
- Athenaeum Music & Arts Library, La Jolla, California, US
- Athenaeum of Philadelphia, Philadelphia, Pennsylvania, US
- Berkshire Athenaeum, Pittsfield, Massachusetts, US
- Boston Athenæum, Boston, Massachusetts, US
- Dunedin Athenaeum and Mechanics' Institute, Dunedin, Otago, NZ
- Folio: The Seattle Athenaeum, Seattle, Washington, US
- Melbourne Athenaeum, Melbourne, Australia
- Minneapolis Athenæum, the name of the first library in Minneapolis, Minnesota, US
- Portsmouth Athenæum, Portsmouth, New Hampshire, US
- Providence Athenaeum, Providence, Rhode Island, US
- Redwood Library and Athenaeum, Newport, Rhode Island, US
- Salem Athenaeum, Salem, Massachusetts, US
- St. Johnsbury Athenaeum, St. Johnsbury, Vermont, US
- Westfield Athenaeum, Westfield, Massachusetts

== Museums ==
- Athenaeum (Alexandria, Virginia), Alexandria, Virginia, US
- Chicago Athenaeum, Chicago, Illinois
- Portsmouth Athenæum, Portsmouth, New Hampshire, US
- Wadsworth Atheneum, Hartford, Connecticut, US
- Wilcannia Athenaeum, Wilcannia, New South Wales, Australia

== Schools ==
=== Europe ===
- Athenaeum (ancient Rome), a school founded by Emperor Hadrian
- Athenaeum Illustre of Amsterdam, Amsterdam, the Netherlands
- Athenaeum illustre, a late name for the University of Franeker (1585-1811)
- Atheneum (school), formal name of main educational track of Dutch Voorbereidend wetenschappelijk onderwijs
- Atheneum, the main variant of the voorbereidend wetenschappelijk onderwijs (vwo) in the Dutch school system
- Genuense Athenaeum, the original name of the University of Genoa
- Limerick Athenaeum, Limerick, Ireland
- Glasgow Athenaeum School of Music, predecessor institute to the Royal Conservatoire of Scotland
- Pontifical Athenaeum, an ecclesiastical university established or approved directly by the Holy See, composed of three main ecclesiastical faculties (Theology, Philosophy and Canon Law) and at least one other faculty.
- Pontifical Athenaeum of Saint Anselm or Anselmianum, the Benedictine Pontifical University in Rome

=== North America ===
- Athenaeum (Tennessee), Columbia, Tennessee, US
- Athenaeum of Ohio, a seminary in Cincinnati, Ohio, US

=== Asia ===
- Ateneo de Manila University, a private university in the Philippines.

== Theaters ==
In Australia

- Melbourne Athenaeum, Melbourne
- Athenaeum Theatre, Sorrento, Melbourne, Victoria
- Athenaeum Theatre, Sydney, New South Wales

In Romania

- Romanian Athenaeum, Bucharest

In the United Kingdom

- The Plymouth Athenaeum, Plymouth, Devon, UK
- Warminster Athenaeum, Warminster, Wiltshire, UK

In the United States

- Howard Athenaeum, Boston, Massachusetts, US
- New Theatre Comique, known as Atheneum in New York City (1865)

== Other uses ==
- Athenaeum (Arcadia), a town of ancient Arcadia, Greece
- Athenaeum (band), a rock band from Greensboro, North Carolina
- Athenaeum (fort), a fort of ancient Arcadia, Greece
- Athenaeum Portrait, also known as The Athenaeum, an unfinished portrait of George Washington

== See also ==
- Ateneum, an art museum in Helsinki, Finland
- Ateneum Theatre, Warsaw
- Athénée de Luxembourg, a secondary school in Luxembourg
- Ateneo (disambiguation), Italian/Spanish
- Athenaeus (disambiguation), Greek name
