= Joseph Fogerty Sr. =

19th century Irish architect

- Born: c. 1806
- Died: 1887
- Occupations: Builder and architect
- Known for: Partner in Joseph Fogerty & Son

Joseph Fogerty Sr. was an Irish builder and architect active in nineteenth-century Limerick. Born in Limerick into a family of builders, he was the father of Robert Fogerty and George J. Fogerty; brother of John Fogerty (engineer), uncle of engineer and novelist Joseph Fogerty of London and architect William Fogerty of Dublin, and great uncle of architect John Frederick Fogerty. He designed and built the Theatre Royal, Limerick, Henry Street. From the 1870s until his death, he was partners with his son Robert in the firm Joseph Fogerty & Son, where he practiced until his 1887 death.

== Works ==
- 1834 Church of Holy Trinity, Church of Ireland, Limerick
- 1841 Theatre Royale, Limerick
- 1856 Harmony Row Presbyterian Church, Ennis, Co. Clare
