= The Three Damosels =

1978 novel by Vera Chapman

The Three Damosels is a 1978 novel written by Vera Chapman.

== Plot summary ==
The Three Damosels is a novel in which a collection of three Arthurian-themed tales blends myth with light fantasy. The collection includes "The Green Knight", "The King's Damosel", and "King Arthur’s Daughter". The first is a reimagining involving Gawain the Younger. "The King's Damosel" features the legendary Lynet as a royal messenger, and the final tale introduces a fictional heir to Arthur.

== Reception ==
Gideon Kibblewhite reviewed The Three Damosels for Arcane magazine, rating it a 6 out of 10 overall, and stated that "This collection can't really be regarded either as a definitive guide or reference, nor as a great work of fiction, though the author is obviously at home with her subject and her fast-paced stories are full of flourish. Perhaps of more and better value to referees and players involved in chivalrous pursuits — and to anyone else interested in Arthurian legend - may be The Chronicles of the Holy Grail."

== Reviews ==
- Review by Philippa Grove-Stephensen (1978) in Paperback Parlour, October 1978
- Review by Shira Daemon (1997) in Locus, #433 February 1997
- Review by Cherith Baldry (1997) in Vector 193
- Review by uncredited (1998) in Vector 201
