= Joseph Wolf =

German natural history artist (1820–1899)

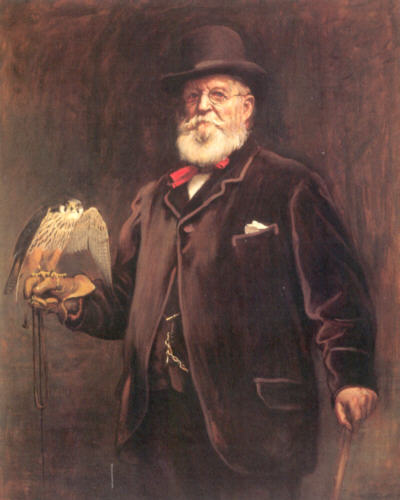
- Joseph Wolf with a Eurasian hobby (Falco subbuteo), original at the Zoological Society of London
- Born: 22 January 1820
- Died: 20 April 1899 (aged 79)
- Known for: Natural history illustration
- Notable work: 340 illustrations for ZSL Proceedings

Joseph Wolf (22 January 1820 – 20 April 1899) was a German artist who specialized in natural history illustration. He moved to the British Museum in 1848 and became the preferred illustrator for explorers and naturalists including David Livingstone, Alfred Russel Wallace and Henry Walter Bates. Wolf depicted animals accurately in lifelike postures and is considered one of the great pioneers of wildlife art. Sir Edwin Landseer thought him "...without exception, the best all-round animal artist who ever lived".

== Germany ==
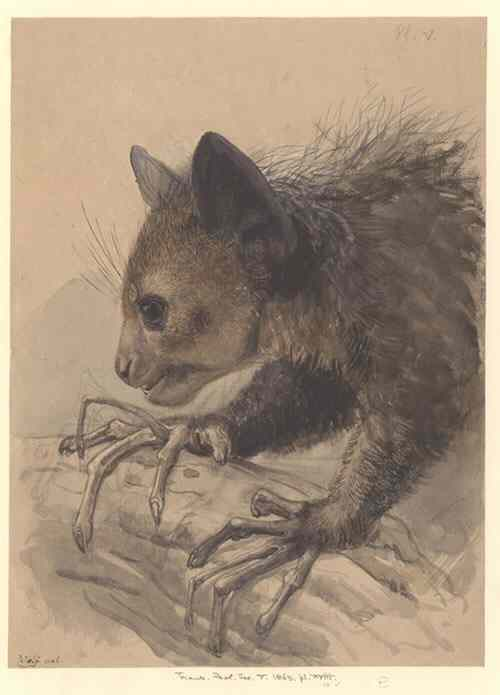
Aye-aye, Daubentonia madagascariensis

Joseph was the first son of a farmer, Anton Wolf, and his wife Elisabeth née Probstfeld. The Minnesota pioneer Randolph Michael Probstfield was his first cousin. Wolf was born in Mörz, near Münstermaifeld, then in Rhenish Prussia, not far from the river Moselle, in the Eifel region. He was originally called Mathias but later went by the name of Joseph. In his boyhood he assiduously studied bird and animal life, and showed a remarkable capacity as a draughtsman of natural history subjects. He showed an early talent for art by cutting paper silhouettes of birds and animals which he pasted onto windows. He later took an interest in hunting. He made himself brushes from the fur of a stone marten, and drew illustrations of birds that he raised from the nest or found near his home. He took a special interest in birds of prey, and considered art as a career but realized at the age of sixteen that he needed more training to be professional. With support from his father he was apprenticed to a firm of lithographers, Gebrüder Becker at Koblenz. Here he found his first illustrated ornithology book (by Johann Conrad Susemihl—he went on to illustrate a later edition of it in the collection of a trader with an interest in birds, and was surprised by the poor quality of the plates). He returned home after three years of apprenticeship, and for a while took up a temporary job with the village headman in searching homes for illegally concealed liquor.

Wolf travelled to Frankfurt and introduced himself as a lithographer to the ornithologist Eduard Rüppell. Rüppell was just beginning to work on the birds of Abyssinia and he encouraged Wolf to work for him either by living in Frankfurt or Darmstadt where he suggested Wolf could work for Johann Jakob Kaup. Wolf moved to Darmstadt but went on working on Rüppell's The Birds of North-East Africa. Kaup was impressed by his abilities and took one of Wolf's sketchbooks to a meeting in Leyden to show to Hermann Schlegel at the Natural History Museum, Leiden. Schlegel immediately commissioned Wolf to work on some plates for Traité de Fauconnerie. The result was a set of "magnificent paintings of birds of prey in life size" which established Wolf's reputation in Europe.

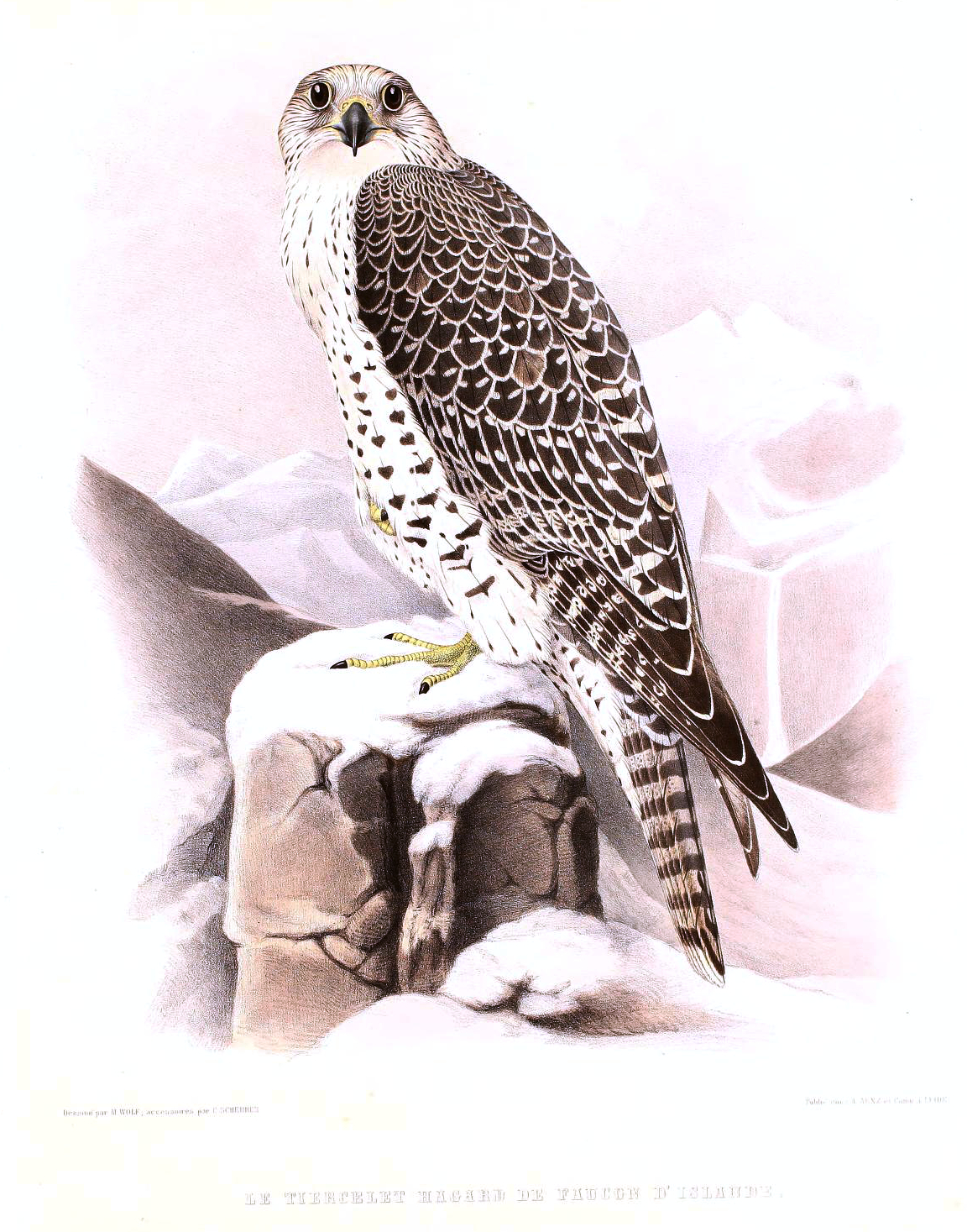
Plate from Traité de fauconnerie, which contains Wolf's first published works

At the age of 20, Wolf was to appear at Maien to join the Army. As a fit young man with sharp-shooting abilities he could not be rejected, but it was peacetime and the surgeon, who knew him, helped him avoid recruitment under the pretext of a weak chest. Back in Darmstadt, Wolf went on working on bird plates, and joined an art school where he worked on portraits, landscapes and copying of works in the Darmstadt Gallery. He was a keen observer of wild birds and once had a pit dug in which he sat all day to watch the courtship of black grouse. In 1847, he left Darmstadt to join the Antwerp Academy to learn the Dutch oil painting techniques. Around this time, Kaup visited the British Museum, he was asked about the German artist who did the plates for Schlegel's book, and Wolf was invited to London to illustrate the genera of birds for a book by George Robert Gray.

== London ==
Wolf travelled to London on 20 March 1848 on the Soho, and was introduced by David William Mitchell, an amateur illustrator himself and a secretary of the Zoological Society of London, to Trübner of Longmans publishing. The very next day was set to work on Gray's The Genera of Birds. While at work in the insect room of the British Museum, he met other naturalists including J. O. Westwood with whom he could converse in French. He was a friend of William Russell, an accountant and a Campbell related to the Duke of Argyll. Russell brought Sir Edwin Landseer and the Duke of Argyll to see the works of Wolf. The Duke soon became a patron and he was also introduced to the Duke of Westminster. Wolf's paintings were also appreciated by the Pre-Raphaelite Brotherhood of London.

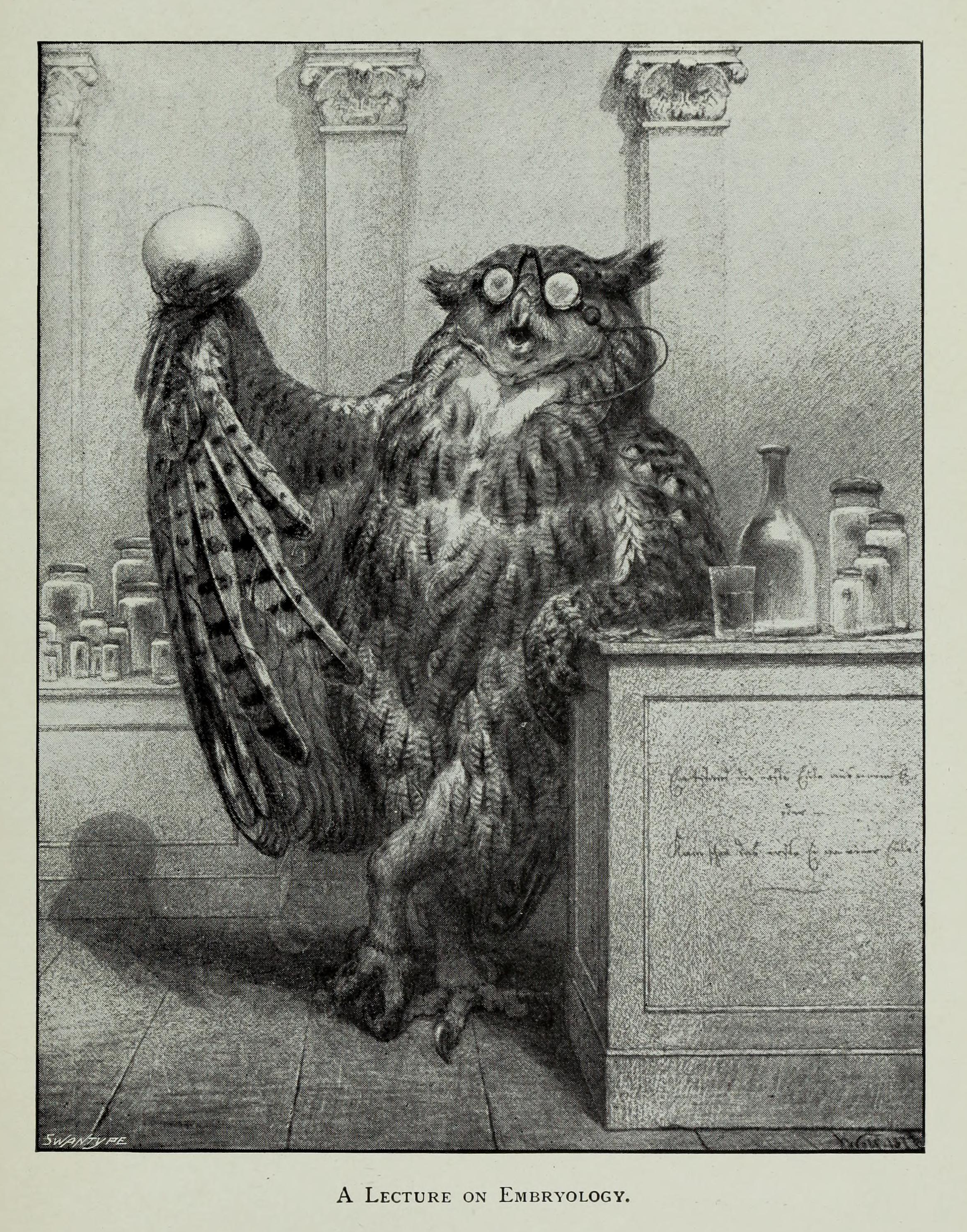
A cartoon by Wolf, the inscription reads "Highly learned makes a fool".

John Gould admired Wolf and would have liked him on his staff, but Wolf only contributed illustrations on a freelance basis. Wolf accompanied Gould on a collection trip to Norway. Wolf thought of Gould as a shrewd and uncouth man. Wolf also noted that Gould lacked a knowledge of feather patterning, apart from knowing nothing about composition, with a tendency to add too much colour, claiming that specimens in the wild were brighter.

Wolf was commissioned by the Zoological Society of London to paint a watercolour of wapiti deer in the snow; it is dated January 1881. Wolf soon became the illustrator of choice for all the books published by returning adventurers like David Livingstone, Alfred Russel Wallace and Henry Walter Bates (for instance Bates' 1863 book The Naturalist on the River Amazons).

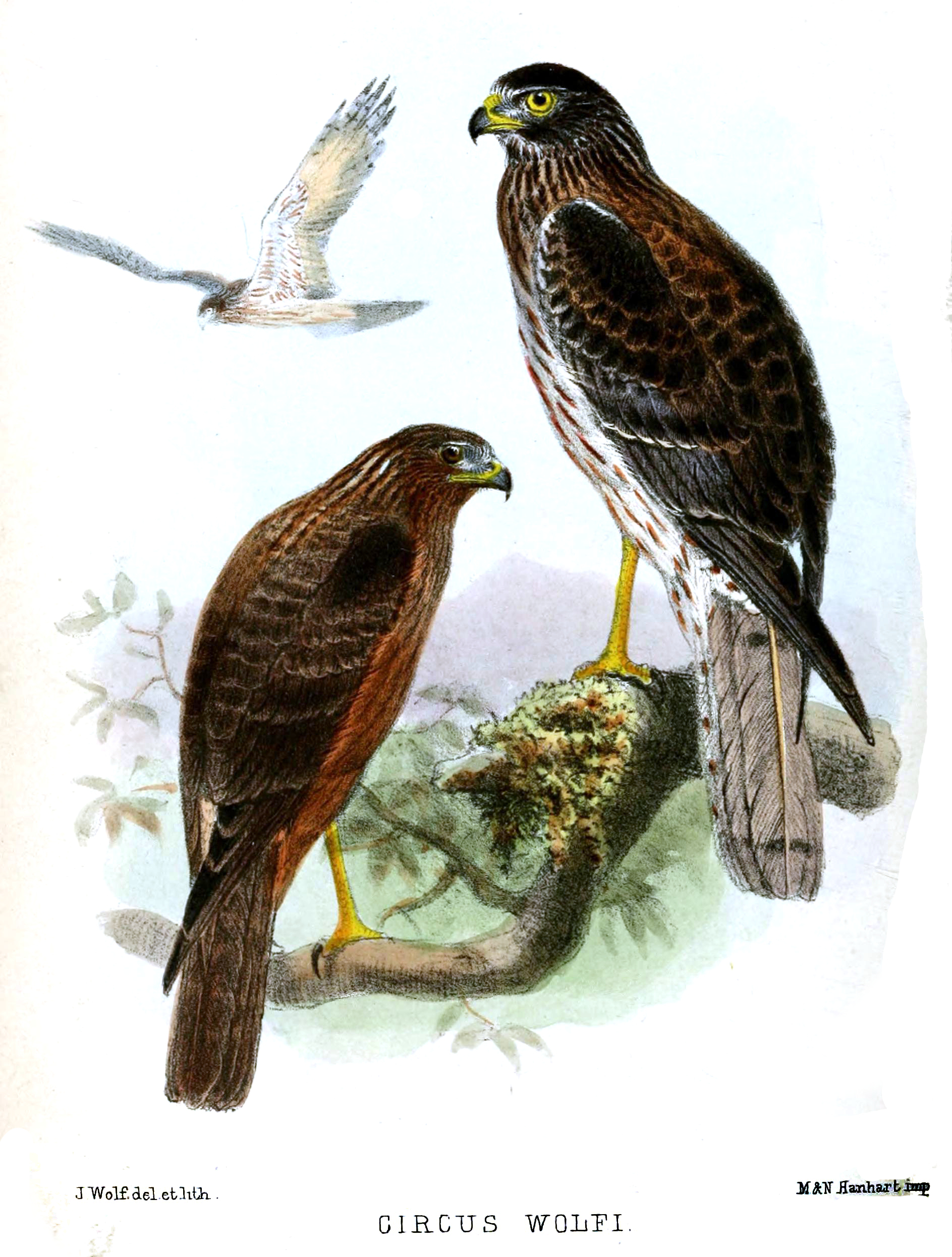
Circus wolfi was named after Wolf in 1865, but the older name Circus approximans has priority.

Wolf joined an association called the German Athenaeum which was founded in 1869 and members met for scientific, literary and musical evenings. For their exhibitions he worked on a range of compositions often with natural elements. His favourite medium was charcoal and ink. Wolf became treasurer to a fund for German widows during the Franco-Prussian War of 1870. After the war, he met Daniel Giraud Elliot in Paris and visited a battlefield. He rendered the image in a design called "Peace and War" with turtle doves on a bush over a soldier's helmet. He also produces some cartoon-like illustrations including "Lecture on Embryology" in which he taunts certain men of science. When Charles Darwin began his study of animal expressions, he was introduced by Abraham Dee Bartlett, the zoo superintendent, to the abilities of Wolf in illustrating minute details of animals in action. Darwin requested Wolf to make some illustrations from photographs and living animals in the zoological garden. Wolf held his own opinions on the reliability of others' observations and even doubted Darwin's interpretation of the face of a monkey as a "laugh". Darwin visited him on several occasions and Wolf appreciated him for being very approachable, someone that even "a child could talk to".

== Impact ==
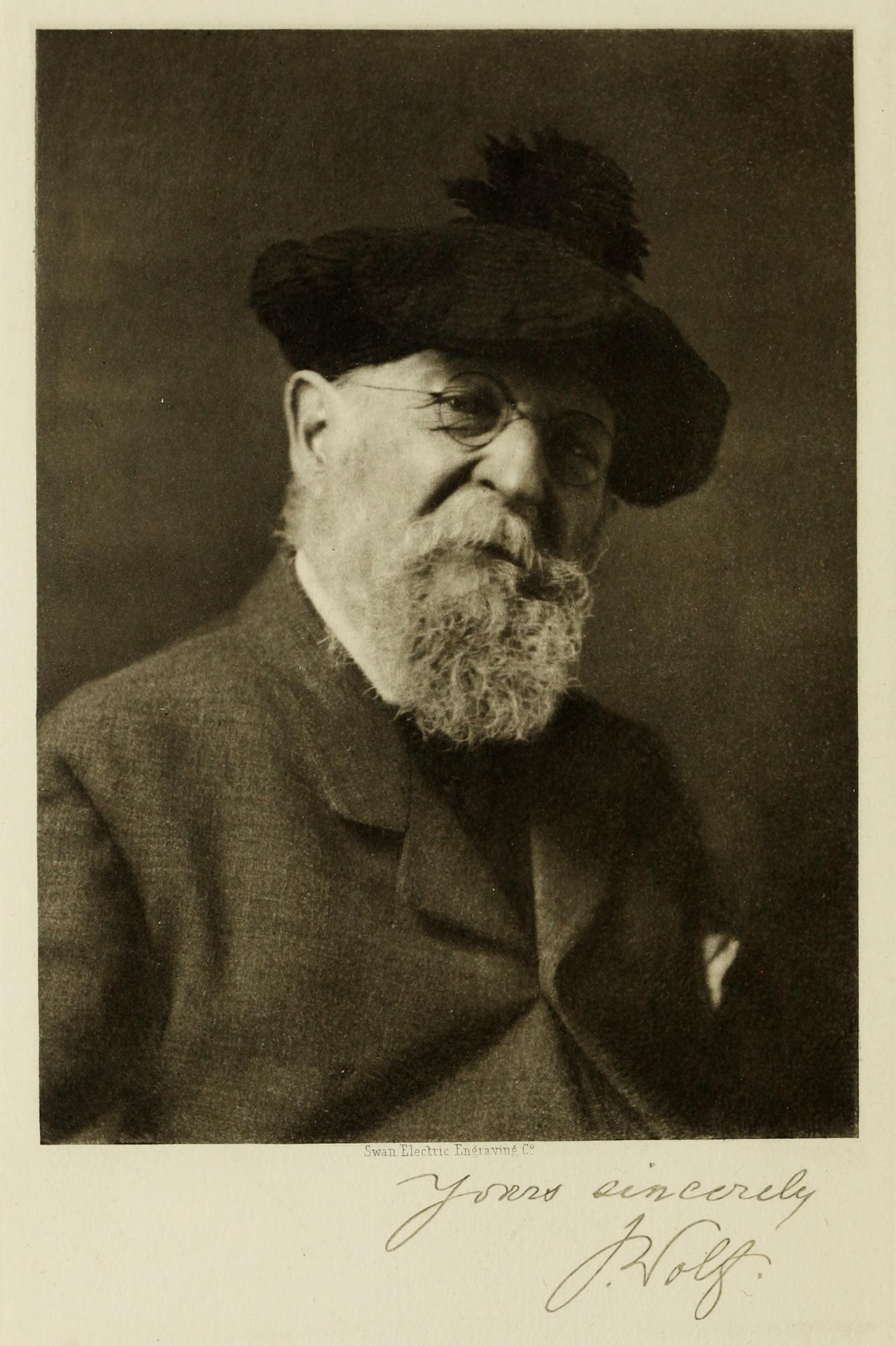

Wolf's abilities were widely acclaimed even in his lifetime. Wolf established wildlife art as a genre and his observation of living birds allowed him to produce illustrations in very accurate and lifelike stances. On occasion he would come back from a trip and produce very accurate sketches from memory. He was very careful in his observation of feather patterns and when he read the works of Sundevall and Nitzsch on pterylography, he had nothing new to learn. The zoologist Alfred Newton called him "the greatest of all animal painters", while Landseer said that Wolf must have been a bird before he became a man. Wolf made numerous drawings in pen and charcoal as well as lithographs for scholarly societies such as the Zoological Society of London (he produced 340 "attractive" colour plates for the ZSL Proceedings in the course of 30 years), and a very large number of illustrations for books on natural history and travel published from various countries; and was considerably successful as a painter as well. Until 1946, the cover of the journal Ibis carried a woodcut by Wolf of an ibis against a background with ruins, a pyramid and a rising sun. In 1946 the sun was removed from the background; the design was entirely changed in 1948 due to excessive wear of the block. In 1865, J. H. Gurney named a species of harrier after Wolf, but it was found to be an already described species.

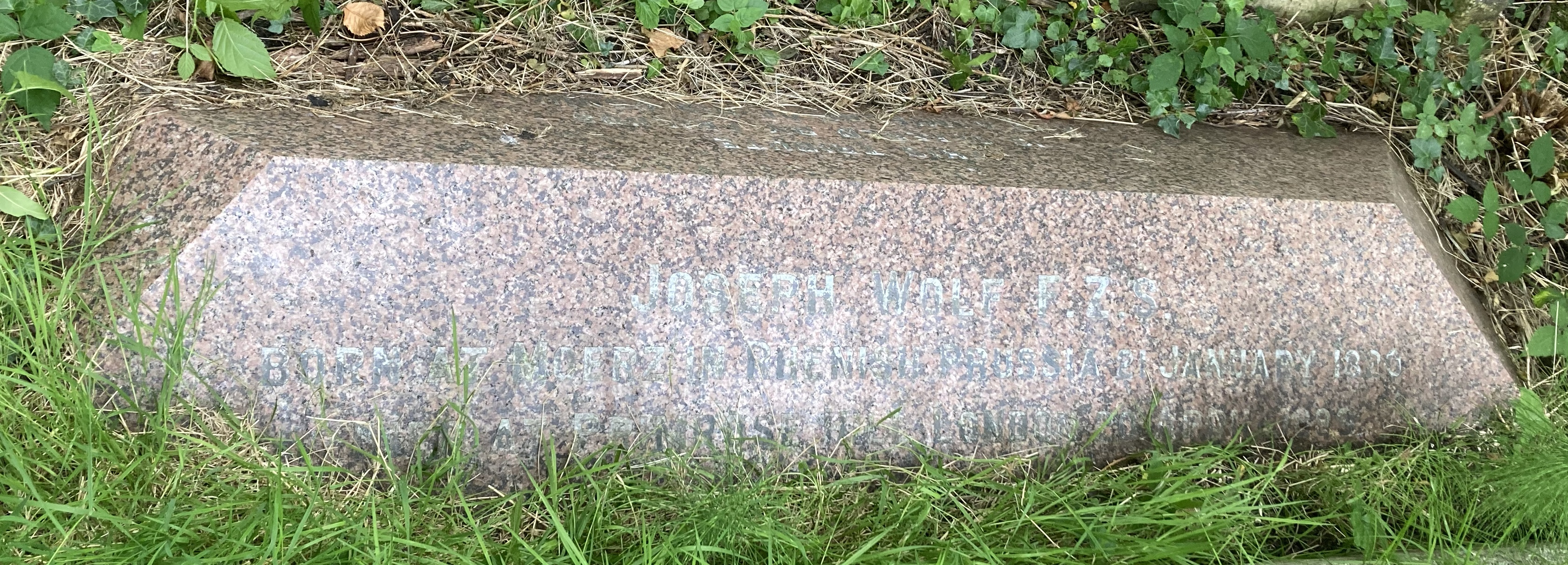
Grave of Joseph Wolf in Highgate Cemetery

Wolf died in London, surrounded by his pet birds. He is buried on the eastern side of Highgate Cemetery.

In 2002, a new road in Mörz, "Joseph Wolf Weg", was named after the artist.

Wolf had four daughters, two of whom had children. His direct descendants live in the United Kingdom, South Africa and New Zealand.

His bicentenary was celebrated with a "Joseph Wolf year" in Mörz in January 2020.

== Cited references ==
- Fisher, Clemency Thorne (2004). "Wolf, Joseph (1820–1899)". Oxford Dictionary of National Biography. Oxford Dictionary of National Biography (online ed.). Oxford University Press. doi:10.1093/ref:odnb/29829. (Subscription, Wikipedia Library access or UK public library membership required.)
- Moreau, R.E. (1959). "The Centenarian 'Ibis'". Ibis. 101 (1): 19–38. doi:10.1111/j.1474-919X.1959.tb02353.x.
- Palmer, AH (1895). The life of Joseph Wolf. London and New York: Longmans, Green and Co.
