= Maurice Brooks (politician) =

Irish politician (1823–1905)

Member of Parliament for Dublin City
- In office 31 January 1874 – 24 November 1885
- Preceded by: Dominic Corrigan; Jonathan Pim
- Succeeded by: Constituency abolished

Lord Mayor of Dublin
- In office 1 January 1874 – 1 January 1875
- Preceded by: Sir James Mackey
- Succeeded by: Peter Paul McSwiney

Personal details
- Born: 1823
- Died: 6 December 1905 (aged 81–82)
- Party: Home Rule League; Irish Parliamentary Party

Maurice Brooks (c. 1823 – 6 December 1905) was an Irish Home Rule League politician, and woman's suffragist.

He was elected Home Rule Member of Parliament (MP) for Dublin City in 1874, and remained MP until the seat was abolished in 1885.

In February 1871, at the end of a woman's suffrage tour of Ireland undertaken by Isabella Tod, Brooks attended the formation in Dublin of a committee (which he regularly attended with the Orangeman and unionist MP for Belfast, William Johnston) from which emerged the Dublin Women's Suffrage Association. At Westminster he regularly presented the Association's suffrage petitions.

Brooks was Lord Mayor of Dublin from 1874 to 1875.

== Arms ==
Coat of arms of Maurice Brooks

Notes
Granted 20 September 1873 by Sir John Bernard Burke, Ulster King of Arms.
Crest
On a mount Vert a badger passant Proper the dexter forepaw resting on a civic crown as in the arms.
Escutcheon
Azure on a cross engrailed Argent a civic crown Vert in the first quarter a trefoil slipped Or.
Motto
Respice Aspice Prospice

Parliament of the United Kingdom
Preceded by Dominic Corrigan and Jonathan Pim	Member of Parliament for Dublin City; 1874 – 1885; With: Arthur Guinness (until 1880); Robert Dyer Lyons (from 1880)	Constituency abolished
Civic offices
Preceded by Sir James Mackey	Lord Mayor of Dublin; 1874–1875	Succeeded by Peter Paul McSwiney
