= Quest for Camelot Dragon Games =

1998 children's computer game by Knowledge Adventure

- Developer: Knowledge Adventure
- Publisher: Knowledge Adventure
- Platform: Windows/Mac
- Release: 1998
- Genres: Action, Strategy

Quest for Camelot Dragon Games is a 1998 video game based on the Warner Bros. film Quest for Camelot and developed by Knowledge Adventure. It was released as a tie-in with the release of the film.

== Gameplay and plot ==
This game contains a collection of mini-games for children based around the characters of the Warner Bros. animated film Quest for Camelot.

Working Mother magazine explains, "What child wouldn't jump at the chance to raise a baby dragon? With this game, kids can give their critter a bottle, rock it to sleep, entertain it when it reaches middle childhood and supervise it during the dreaded teen years."

== Critical reception ==
In their review of the game, SuperKids said: "Even fans of the Warner Brothers animated feature "Quest for Camelot" will be disappointed with this uninspiring software adventure. In fact, if not for the addition of a virtual pet - a charismatic dragon that the user raises from a hatchling to a self-sufficient pre-teen, the program would be a total ho-hum."
