= Ateneo =

Ateneo may refer to:

== Cultural institutions ==
- Ateneo de la Juventud, a society of Mexican writers, philosophers and intellectuals
- Ateneo de Madrid, a private cultural institution located in the capital of Spain
- Ateneo de Ponce, a nonprofit, civic, organization in Ponce, Puerto Rico
- Ateneo Puertorriqueño, one of Puerto Rico's chief cultural institutions
- Ateneo de Sevilla, a cultural, scientific, literary, and artistic association in Seville, Spain
- Ateneo Veneto, an institution for science, literature, and arts in Venice, Italy

== Schools run by the Society of Jesus in the Philippines ==
=== Teaching and research universities ===
- Ateneo de Davao University
- Ateneo de Manila University
- Ateneo de Naga University
- Ateneo de Zamboanga University
- Xavier University – Ateneo de Cagayan

=== Non-tertiary Schools ===
- Sacred Heart School – Ateneo de Cebu
- Ateneo de Iloilo - Santa Maria Catholic School

=== Defunct institutions ===
- Ateneo de San Pablo
- Ateneo de Tuguegarao

== Other uses ==
- El Ateneo Grand Splendid, a bookshop in Buenos Aires, Argentina
- Ateneo F.C., an association football club based in Quezon City in the Philippines
- Athenaeus of Naucratis, ancient Greek rhetorician and grammarian

== See also ==
- Athenaeum (disambiguation)
