= Vera Chapman =

British fantasy writer (1898–1996)

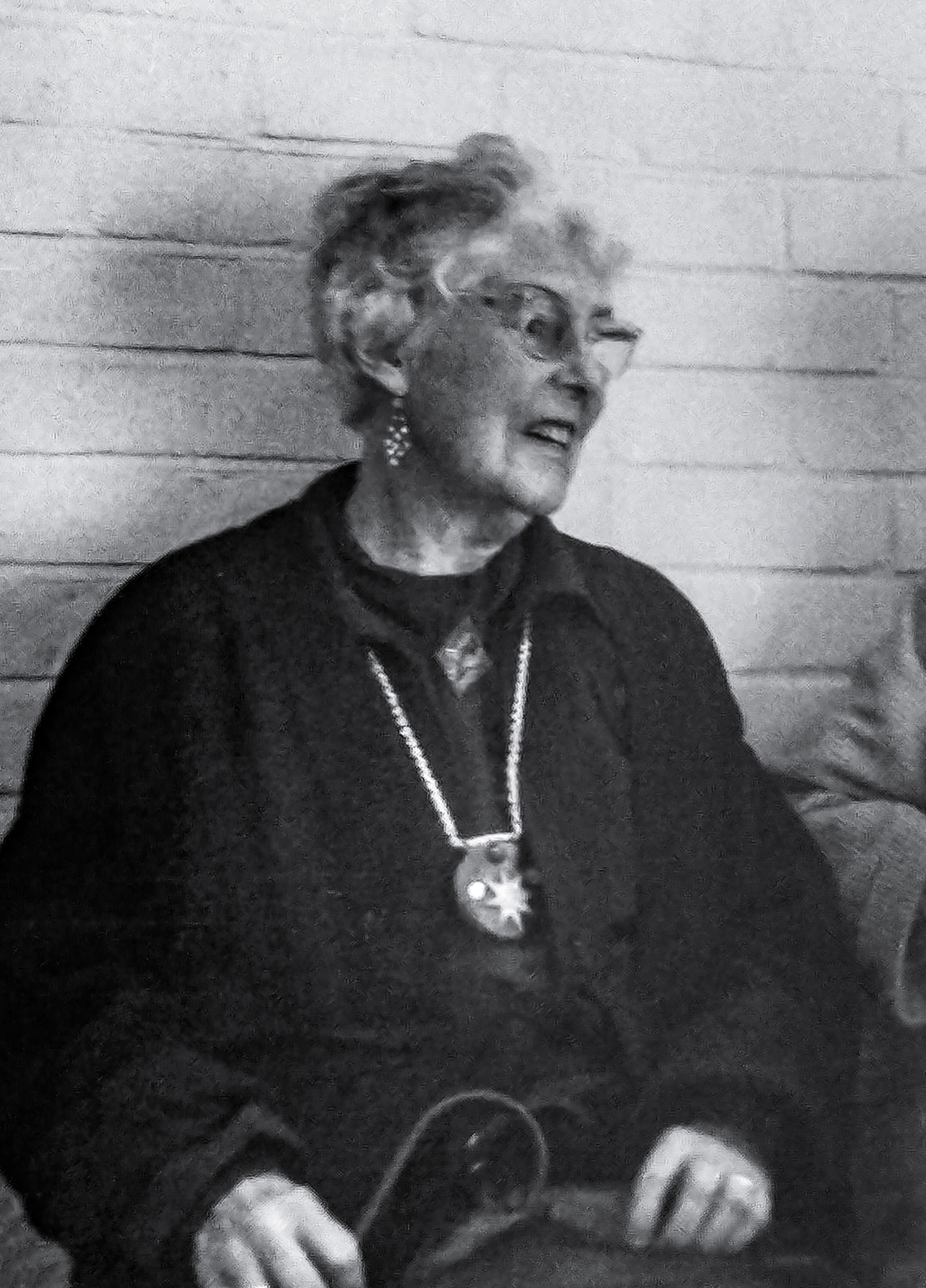
- Vera Chapman at The Eagle and Child during Oxonmoot in Oxford, 1979
- Born: Vera Ivy May Fogerty; 8 May 1898; Bournemouth, England
- Died: 14 May 1996 (aged 98); Croydon, England

Vera Chapman (8 May 1898 – 14 May 1996), also known as Vera Ivy May Fogerty, and within the Tolkien Society as Belladonna Took, was a British author and founder of the Tolkien Society in the United Kingdom, and also wrote a number of pseudo-historical and Arthurian books. She held the title of Pendragon of The Order of Bards, Ovates and Druids from 1964 to 1991.

== Life ==
Chapman was born in Bournemouth, England on 8 May 1898, the daughter of Irish architect, John Frederick Fogerty. She lived in South Africa until she went to Lady Margaret Hall, Oxford where she was one of the first women to matriculate as a full member of Oxford University. In 1969, she founded the Tolkien Society in Britain of which she was the first secretary. She persuaded J. R. R. Tolkien to become the Society's honorary president in June 1972.

In 1975, Chapman, then aged 77, saw her first novel published, and she continued writing until her death in 1996. She wrote three fantasy novels based on Arthurian legend: The Green Knight (1975), King Arthur's Daughter (1976), and The King's Damosel (1976) These were later gathered together in an omnibus edition under the title The Three Damosels (1978).

== Works ==
=== Novels ===
- The Green Knight (1975) ISBN 0-901720-63-1 (UK edition)
- King Arthur's Daughter (1976) ISBN 0-86036-012-1 (UK ed.)
- The King's Damosel (1976) ISBN 0-86036-018-0 (UK ed.) – basis for the Warner Bros. animated movie Quest for Camelot
- Judy and Julia (1977) ISBN 0-86036-020-2 (UK ed.)
- Blaedud the Birdman (1978) ISBN 0-86036-080-6 (UK ed.)
- The Three Damosels (1978) ISBN 0-417-02650-1 (UK ed.)
- The Wife of Bath (1978) ISBN 0-86036-057-1 (UK ed.) – an adaptation of Chaucer's "The Wife of Bath's Tale"
- Miranty and the Alchemist (1983) ISBN 0-233-98042-3 (UK ed.)
- The Enchantresses (1998), by Chapman and Mike Ashley ISBN 0-575-06524-9 (UK ed.)

=== Omnibus ===
- The Three Damosels (1978) ISBN 0-575-06340-8 (UK ed.)

=== Collections ===
- The Notorious Abbess (1993) ISBN 0-89733-387-X (US ed.)

=== Short stories ===
- "Crusader Damosel" (1978); in the 1978 anthology The Fantastic Imagination II, edited by Robert H. Boyer & Kenneth J. Zahorski
- "The Thread" (1980); in the 1980 anthology The Phoenix Tree, edited by Robert H. Boyer & Kenneth J. Zahorski
- "A Sword for Arthur" (1995); in the 1995 anthology The Merlin Chronicles
- “Belladonna by Belladonna” parts 1-4 (1985-87); in ‘’Weathertop Magazine 3-5’’, edited by Denis Bridoux
