= Robert Dyer Lyons =

Irish physician

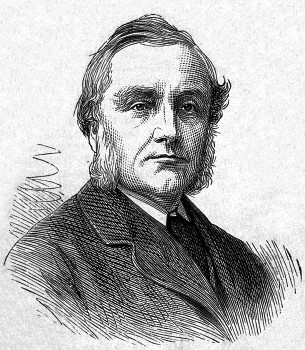
Robert Spencer Dyer Lyons

Robert Spencer Dyer Lyons MP (13 August 1826 – 19 December 1886) was an Irish physician.

== Life ==
Lyons, born at Cork in 1826, was the son of Sir William Lyons (1794–1858), a merchant there, who was mayor in 1848 and 1849, and was knighted by the queen on her visit to Cork on 3 August 1849. His mother was Harriet, daughter of Robert Spencer Dyer of Kinsale.

Robert was educated at Hamblin and Porter's Grammar School, Cork, and at Trinity College, Dublin, where he graduated in 1848 as a bachelor in medicine. He became a licentiate of the Royal College of Surgeons in Ireland in the following year, and in 1855 was appointed chief pathological commissioner to the British Army in the Crimea, where he reported on the disease then prevalent in the trenches before Sevastopol. On 8 September 1855, he was awarded the Crimean and Turkish medals and clasps for Sevastopol. In 1856, he married Marie, daughter of David Richard Pigot, Lord Chief Baron of the Irish Exchequer, and his wife Catherine Page.

In 1857, he undertook a voluntary mission to Lisbon to investigate the pathological anatomy of yellow fever which was raging there, and for his report on that subject received from King Pedro V of Portugal the cross and insignia of the Ancient Order of Christ. He then joined St George's Hospital, Dublin, where he took an active share in the education of the army medical staff. He was also a professor of medicine in the Roman Catholic university medical school, a senator of the Royal University of Ireland, 1880, crown nominee for Ireland in the General Medical Council of the United Kingdom on 29 November 1881, physician to the House of Industry hospitals, and visiting physician to Maynooth College.

In 1870, he was invited by Mr. Gladstone's government to act on a commission of inquiry into the treatment of Irish treason-felony prisoners in English prisons, and in connection with this inquiry, he visited many French prisons and reported on the discipline exercised in that country. He enthusiastically recommended the reafforesting of Ireland, and with the concurrence of government collected information on forests from foreign countries, which was embodied in an article in the Journal of Forestry and Estate Management, February 1883, pp. 656–9.

He sat in the House of Commons of the United Kingdom as a Member of Parliament (MP) for the Dublin City as a Liberal from April 1880 till the general election in 1885, and spoke on the Parliamentary Oaths Act 1 May 1883.

He died at 89 Merrion Square, Dublin, on 19 December 1886.

== Bibliography ==
1. ‘An Apology for the Microscope,’ 1851.
2. ‘A Handbook of Hospital Practice, or an Introduction to the Practical Study of Medicine at the Bedside,’ 1859.
3. ‘A Treatise on Fever,’ 1861.
4. ‘Intellectual Resources of Ireland. Supply and Demand for an enlarged System of Irish University Education,’ 1873.
5. ‘Irish Intermediate Education and the Civil Service of Cyprus,’ 1878.
6. ‘Forest Areas in Europe and America, and probable future Timber Supplies,’ 1884.

Parliament of the United Kingdom
Preceded by Sir Arthur Guinness, Bt; Maurice Brooks	Member of Parliament for Dublin City; 1880–1885; With: Maurice Brooks	constituency divided
