= Quest for Camelot =

1998 American animated film

- Theatrical release poster by John Alvin
- Directed by: Frederik Du Chau
- Screenplay by: Kirk DeMicco; William Schifrin; Jacqueline Feather; David Seidler
- Based on: The King's Damosel by Vera Chapman
- Produced by: Dalisa Cooper Cohen
- Starring: Jessalyn Gilsig; Cary Elwes; Gary Oldman; Eric Idle; Don Rickles; Jane Seymour; Pierce Brosnan; Bronson Pinchot; Jaleel White; Gabriel Byrne; John Gielgud
- Edited by: Stanford C. Allen
- Music by: Patrick Doyle
- Production company: Warner Bros. Feature Animation
- Distributed by: Warner Bros.
- Release date: May 15, 1998
- Running time: 86 minutes
- Country: United States
- Language: English
- Budget: $40 million
- Box office: $38.1 million

Quest for Camelot (released internationally as The Magic Sword: Quest for Camelot) is a 1998 American animated musical fantasy film directed by Frederik Du Chau and written by Kirk DeMicco, William Schifrin, and the writing team of Jacqueline Feather and David Seidler. Loosely inspired by the 1976 novel The King's Damosel by Vera Chapman, the film stars Jessalyn Gilsig, Cary Elwes, Gary Oldman, Eric Idle, Don Rickles, Jane Seymour, Pierce Brosnan, Bronson Pinchot, Jaleel White, Gabriel Byrne and John Gielgud (in his final film role). The story follows Kayley (Gilsig), an adventurous young woman whose father was a Knight of the Round Table killed by the evil Sir Ruber (Oldman). When Ruber's renewed plot to usurp Camelot from King Arthur (Brosnan) by stealing Arthur's sword Excalibur goes awry, Kayley joins the blind hermit Garrett (Elwes) and a two-headed dragon, Devon and Cornwall (Idle and Rickles), in a quest to retrieve the sword and save the kingdom. It features seven original songs written by David Foster and Carole Bayer Sager, and an original musical orchestral score composed by Patrick Doyle.

Initially titled The Quest for the Grail, the film was announced in May 1995 as Warner Bros. Feature Animation's debut project, with Bill Kroyer and Du Chau jointly directing the film. It began production later that year, but faced delays when animators were reassigned to help finish Space Jam (1996). During the interim, the story was heavily reworked, with the narrative's central focus being changed from the Holy Grail to Excalibur. Creative differences spurred by these alterations resulted in prominent members of the animation and management staff, including Kroyer, leaving the project. Due to its troubled production, the film's release was pushed back by six months. Animation was mostly done in Glendale, California and in London.

Quest for Camelot was released by Warner Bros. under their Family Entertainment label on May 15, 1998, in the US and Canada. It received mixed reviews from critics and was a box-office disappointment, grossing $38.1 million worldwide against a $40 million production budget. One of the film's songs, "The Prayer", won the Golden Globe Award for Best Original Song and was nominated for the Academy Award for Best Original Song.

== Plot ==
Sir Lionel, a knight of the Round Table, is killed foiling an assassination attempt on King Arthur by the evil Sir Ruber, who is then driven off by Excalibur, Arthur's sword. During Lionel's funeral, Arthur informs Lionel's widow Lady Juliana and his daughter Kayley that Camelot is always open to them. Kayley dreams of becoming a knight, like her father, and she trains herself while working on the farm.

A decade later, Ruber's griffin attacks Camelot and steals Excalibur, leaving Arthur injured. Merlin the wizard's pet falcon Ayden attacks the griffin, causing it to drop the sword into the Forbidden Forest. When Kayley learns what has occurred, she plans to search for Excalibur, but gets into an argument with her mother, who fears for her life. Ruber attacks the farm and abducts Kayley and Juliana with intent of using them to gain access to Camelot. He uses a potion he acquired from witches to fuse his henchmen and a henpecked rooster named Bladebeak with their weapons. Ruber becomes angry when he learns Excalibur is lost in the Forbidden Forest. Overhearing this, Kayley escapes into the forest, pursued by the steel men and Bladebeak. She is saved by a blind hermit Garrett and Ayden. After learning of the theft, Garrett plans to find Excalibur with Ayden and Kayley persuades Garrett to let her join the quest. Meanwhile, Ruber learns of this from Bladebeak and decides to follow them to obtain Excalibur.

Kayley and Garrett encounter a wisecracking two-headed dragon Devon and Cornwall. The two dislike each other and dream of being separated; due to their disagreement, they cannot fly or breathe fire. After helping them evade from a group of attacking dragons, who are taken out by Ruber and his henchmen, Devon and Cornwall join their quest. During a night of rest, much to Kayley's reluctance, Garrett reveals he was once a stable boy in Camelot who dreamt of becoming a knight. While saving horses from a fire, he was kicked in the head which caused his blindness. Following the accident, Lionel still believed in Garrett and trained him personally. Garrett teaches Kayley more about the forest, including the existence of magical healing plants.

The next day, after only finding Excalibur's belt in a giant footprint, Kayley's frustrated ranting unintentionally distracts Garrett from hearing Ayden's warning, causing him to get injured by Ruber's men. Kayley saves him by using the sentient trees to trap Ruber and his men. She escorts Garrett to a remote cave where she uses a healing plant to heal his wounds. They reconcile and profess their love for each other. Discovering the scabbard, the group enter a giant cave where a rock-like ogre holds Excalibur, using it as a toothpick. They recover Excalibur and manage to evade Ruber.

After reaching the end of the forest, Garrett gives Excalibur to Kayley and returns to the forest, claiming he does not belong in Camelot. However, Ruber captures Kayley and takes Excalibur. He melds it to his right arm with his potion before imprisoning Kayley in the wagon with Juliana. Devon and Cornwall witness this and inform Garrett, who decides to go and rescue Kayley. By collaborating for the first time, Devon and Cornwall are able to fly and breathe fire, and they fly Garrett to Camelot. Meanwhile, Bladebeak reconciles with his constantly henpecking hen and frees Kayley from her ropes. She warns the guards of Ruber's trap, exposing him and his steel men. Garrett, Devon and Cornwall arrive shortly to assist.

While Devon and Cornwall save Ayden by breathing fire at the griffin, Kayley and Garrett discover Ruber attempting to kill Arthur inside the castle. They intervene and trick Ruber into returning Excalibur to the stone. Ruber is vaporized by the stone's magic, which reverts his henchmen, including Bladebeak, back to normal, restores Excalibur to its original state, heals Arthur, and temporarily separates Devon and Cornwall, who decide to reunite. Later, with Excalibur returned to Arthur, Kayley and Garrett are made knights of the Round Table and ride off into the distance together on horseback.

== Voice cast ==
- Jessalyn Gilsig as Kayley, a young woman who aspires to be a knight. (Note: Nassos Vakalis served as Kayley's supervising animator.)
  - Andrea Corr as Kayley's singing voice.
  - Sarah Rayne (Also known as Sarah Freeman) as young Kayley.
- Cary Elwes as Garrett, a blind hermit who joins Kayley's quest. (Note: Crystal S. Klabunde served as Garrett's supervising animator.)
  - Bryan White as Garrett's singing voice.
- Gary Oldman as Lord Ruber, an evil knight plotting to steal Excalibur in order to become king of Camelot and is loosely based on the Red Knight. (Note: Alexander Williams served as Lord Ruber's supervising animator.)
- Eric Idle and Don Rickles as Devon and Cornwall, a comic relief two-headed dragon whom Kayley and Garrett meet. Devon is long-necked, intellectual and polite while Cornwall is short-necked, lowbrow and wisecracking. (Note: Dan Wagner respectively served as Devon and Cornwall's supervising animator.)
- Jane Seymour as Juliana, Kayley's widowed mother, who has reservations over Kayley becoming a knight. (Note: Cynthia L. Overman served as Juliana's supervising animator.)
  - Celine Dion as Juliana's singing voice.
- Pierce Brosnan as King Arthur, the legendary King of England who resides in Camelot.
  - Steve Perry as King Arthur's singing voice.
- Bronson Pinchot as Griffin, Ruber's pet and enforcer.
- Jaleel White as Bladebeak, a rooster who is fused with an axe by Ruber. (Note: Stephan A. Franck served as Bladebeak's supervising animator.)
- Gabriel Byrne as Sir Lionel, Kayley's father who is killed by Ruber when defending King Arthur. Before his death, Lionel trained Garrett when he was younger, even after he was rendered blind.
- John Gielgud as Merlin, a wizard and Arthur's advisor. This was the last film of Gielgud's career.
- Frank Welker as Ayden, Merlin's pet falcon that guides Garrett.

== Production ==
In May 1995, The Quest for the Grail was Warner Bros. Feature Animation's first announced project. Bill Kroyer and Frederik Du Chau were announced as the directors, with Sue Kroyer serving as co-producer. The initial story centered around a young female character named Susannah, who embarks on a dangerous quest for the Holy Grail to save her sister from the ruthless and powerful Red Knight. Elizabeth Chandler, who had co-written the screenplay for A Little Princess (1995), was enlisted to write the script. However, she was replaced by a team of several screenwriters, which included Kirk DeMicco (who went on to direct The Croods and Ruby Gillman, Teenage Kraken). Prior to his involvement, DeMicco had sold his spec script A Day in November to Warner Bros. for $1 million. According to Lauren Faust, who was an animator for the film, it was initially envisioned with a PG-13 rating and was meant to draw homage to Ralph Bakshi's Wizards (1977), but it was changed to be more family-friendly to compete with the Disney Renaissance films.

The film was put into production before the story was finalized. However, during the fall of 1995, the animators were reassigned to finish Space Jam (1996). Meanwhile, in April 1996, Christopher Reeve was cast as King Arthur. During the interim, several story changes were made that resulted in creative differences between the Kroyers and the studio management. In particular, Excalibur replaced the Holy Grail, which Warner Bros. Feature Animation president Max Howard felt better reflected the film's setting: "The symbol of Camelot is the power of Excalibur, and that became a more interesting theme: Whoever held the sword, held the power." By the middle of 1996, the Kroyers were allegedly fired by Howard, who later moved on to developing another project at Warner Bros. Feature Animation.

Following the departure of the Kroyers, two supervising animators along with several employees in the studio's art department subsequently left the project. The film's initial producer, Frank Gladstone, left the project in February 1997 and was replaced with Dalisa Cohen. Effects supervisor Michel Gagné recalled that "People were giving up. The head of layout was kicked out, the head of background, the executive producer, the producer, the director, the associate producer—all the heads rolled. It's kind of a hard environment to work in." Eventually, Du Chau was promoted to be the film's director. Meanwhile, Reeve was replaced by Pierce Brosnan when he became unavailable to record new dialogue.

In an article in Animation Magazine, Chrystal Klabunde, the leading animator of Garrett, stated, "It was top heavy. All the executives were happily running around and playing executive, getting corner offices—but very few of them had any concept about animation at all, about doing an animated film. It never occurred to anybody at the top that they had to start from the bottom and build that up. The problems were really coming at the inexperience of everyone involved. Those were people from Disney that had the idea that you just said, 'Do it,' and it gets done. It never occurred to them that it got done because Disney had an infrastructure in place, working like clockwork. We didn't have that." Reportedly, "cost overruns and production nightmares" led the studio to "reconsider their commitment to feature animation." Filmmaker Brad Bird (who directed The Iron Giant, Warner Bros.' next animated film) thought that micromanaging, which he said had worked well for Disney but not for Warner Bros., had been part of the problem.

=== Animation ===
The film was mainly animated at the main Warner Bros. Feature Animation facility located in Glendale, California and London, England. In January 1996, the London animation studio was opened where more than 50 animators were expected to animate 20 minutes of animation, which would be sent back to Glendale to be inked-and-painted. Additional studios that worked on the film included Yowza! Animation in Toronto, Ontario, where they assisted in clean-up animation, Heart of Texas Productions in Austin, and A. Film A/S in Copenhagen where, along with London, about a quarter of the film was animated overseas. The supervising animators were Athanassios Vakalis for Kayley, Chrystal Klabunde for Garrett, Cynthia Overman for Juliana, Alexander Williams for Ruber, Dan Wagner for Devon and Cornwall, Stephan Franck for the Griffin and Bladebeak and Mike Nguyen for Ayden.

To create the rock-like ogre and other computer-generated effects, the production team used Silicon Graphics' Alias Research software. According to Katherine Percy, the head of CGI effects, the software was originally designed for special effects used in live-action films.

== Music ==
Quest for Camelot: Music from the Motion Picture

Soundtrack album by Various Artists
- Released: May 5, 1998
- Genre: Various
- Length: 45:07
- Label: Atlantic Records
- Producer: Various Artists

Singles from Quest for Camelot: Music from the Motion Picture
- 1. "Looking Through Your Eyes" Released: March 24, 1998; 2. "I Stand Alone" Released: 1 March 1999

Professional ratings
Review scores
Source	Rating
Allmusic	2.5/5 stars

On January 31, 1996, David Foster and Carole Bayer Sager were attached to compose several songs for the film. The album peaked at #117 on the Billboard 200, and won the Golden Globe Award for Best Original Song for "The Prayer". The song was also nominated for the Academy Award for Best Original Song but lost to "When You Believe" from DreamWorks' The Prince of Egypt.

On the soundtrack, "The Prayer" was performed separately by Celine Dion in English and by Andrea Bocelli in Italian. The now better-known Dion-Bocelli duet in both languages first appeared in October 1998 on Dion's Christmas album These Are Special Times; it was also released as a single in March 1999 and on Bocelli's album Sogno in April 1999.

"Looking Through Your Eyes" was the lead single for the soundtrack. Andrea Corr of The Corrs and Bryan White performed the song as a duet in the film, while LeAnn Rimes performed the song during the end credits as the pop version. The second single off the soundtrack, "I Stand Alone" was performed by White in the film and Steve Perry for the end credits. Other original songs composed for the film include "United We Stand", "On My Father's Wings", "Ruber" and "If I Didn't Have You".

=== Track listing ===
All songs are written by David Foster and Carole Bayer Sager, with tracks 2 and 13 co-written by Steve Perry, Tony Renis and Alberto Testa. All scores are composed by Patrick Doyle.

No.	Title	Performer(s)	Length
1.	"Looking Through Your Eyes"	LeAnn Rimes	4:06
2.	"I Stand Alone"	Steve Perry	3:43
3.	"The Prayer"	Celine Dion	2:49
4.	"United We Stand"	Steve Perry	3:20
5.	"On My Father's Wings"	Andrea Corr	3:00
6.	"Looking Through Your Eyes"	Andrea Corr & Bryan White	3:36
7.	"Ruber"	Gary Oldman	3:56
8.	"I Stand All Alone"	Bryan White	3:27
9.	"If I Didn't Have You"	Eric Idle & Don Rickles	2:55
10.	"Dragon Attack/Forbidden Forest" (score)		3:14
11.	"The Battle" (score)		2:49
12.	"Looking Through Your Eyes" (instrumental)		3:57
13.	"The Prayer"	Andrea Bocelli	4:10
Total length:			45:07

== Release ==
The film was originally slated for November 14, 1997 but was pushed to May 15, 1998 to give the production team more time to finish the film.

=== Marketing ===
The film was accompanied with a marketing campaign with promotional licensees including Tyson Foods, Kraft Foods, PepsiCo via Frito-Lay, Kodak, ConAgra Foods via Act II Popcorn and Hasbro via Kenner Products. The fast food restaurant chain Wendy's had toys based on the characters included in a kid's meal, while Kodak had print advertisements on over 200 million photo processing envelopes. Warner Bros. also partnered with Scholastic to produce children's books based on the film.

=== Home media ===
Quest for Camelot was released on VHS and DVD by Warner Home Video in the United States and Canada on October 13, 1998. The VHS edition includes a teaser trailer for Warner Bros. and Morgan Creek Productions' The King and I (1999), while the DVD included several making-of documentaries with interviews of the filmmakers and cast and a music video of "I Stand Alone". To help promote the home video release of the film, Warner partnered with Act II Popcorn, Smucker's, American Express, Continental Airlines, Best Western Hotels, CoinStar and UNICEF, which advertised its trick-or-treat donation boxes before Halloween arrived. Other promotions with the purchase of every video included a free "Devon & Cornwall" pendant, a mail-in offer for a free 14-inch "Devon & Cornwall" stuffed toy, and a Warner Bros. 75th Anniversary savings booklet worth over $150 in special offers and valuable savings.

== Reception ==
=== Critical response ===
On Rotten Tomatoes, the film has an approval rating of 43% based on 29 reviews, with an average rating of 5.2/10. The website's critical consensus reads, "Diminished by uneven animation and treacly songs, Quest for Camelot is an adventure that ought to be tossed back to the Lady in the Lake." On Metacritic, the film has an average score of 50 based on 22 reviews, indicating "mixed or average reviews". Audiences surveyed by CinemaScore gave the film a B+ on a grade scale from A to F.

Owen Gleiberman, reviewing for Entertainment Weekly, wrote, "The images are playful and serviceably lush, but the story and characters might have come out of a screenwriting software program, and the songs (sung by Celine Dion and Steve Perry, among others) are Vegas-pop wallpaper." David Kronke of the Los Angeles Times described the film as "formulaic" and wrote that it was "a nearly perfect reflection of troubling trends in animated features". He called Kayley (Jessalyn Gilsig) "a standard-issue spunky female heroine" and said that "Garrett's blindness is the one adventurous element to the film, but even it seems calculated; his lack of sight is hardly debilitating, yet still provides kids a lesson in acceptance."

Critical of the story, animation, characters and music, James Berardinelli of ReelViews wrote that the film was "dull, uninspired, and, worst of all, characterized by artwork that could charitably be called 'unimpressive' ". Stephen Holden of The New York Times wrote, "Coming on the heels of 20th Century Fox's lush but silly Anastasia (a much better film than this one), Quest for Camelot suggests that Disney still owns the artistic franchise on animated features." Kevin J. Harty, an editor of a collection of essays titled Cinema Arthuriana, says that the film is "slightly indebted to, rather than, as Warner publicity claims, actually based on" Vera Chapman's novel The King's Damosel.

Peter Stack of the San Francisco Chronicle said that the film is "a spirited adventure with generous romantic and comic charms" that "aims to please a range of ages, with loopy gags, corny romance, an oversized villain and catchy tunes performed by Celine Dion and LeAnn Rimes, among others." Joe Leydon of Variety considered the film as a "lightweight but likable fantasy that offers a playfully feminist twist to Arthurian legends" and noted that the "animation, though not quite up to Disney standards, is impressive enough on its own terms to dazzle the eye and serve the story."

=== Box office ===
Quest for Camelot grossed $6 million on its opening weekend, ranking third behind The Horse Whisperer and Deep Impact. The film ultimately grossed $22.5 million during its theatrical run in North America. Cumulatively, the film grossed $38.1 million worldwide. The studio lost about $40 million on the film.

=== Accolades ===
Award	Category	Recipient	Result
Academy Awards	Best Original Song	"The Prayer"; Music by Carole Bayer Sager and David Foster; Lyrics by Carole Bayer Sager, David Foster, Tony Renis and Alberto Testa	Nominated
Annie Awards	Best Animated Feature	Dalisa Cohen	Nominated
Annie Awards	Outstanding Individual Achievement for Effects Animation	Michel Gagné	Nominated
Artios Awards	Best Casting for Animated Voice-Over	Julie Hughes, Barry Moss and Jessica Gilburne	Nominated
Golden Globe Awards	Best Original Song	"The Prayer"; Music by Carole Bayer Sager and David Foster; Lyrics by Carole Bayer Sager, David Foster, Tony Renis and Alberto Testa	Won
Golden Reel Awards	Best Sound Editing – Animated Feature		Nominated
Online Film & Television Association Awards	Best Family Score	Patrick Doyle, David Foster and Carole Bayer Sager	Nominated

The film is recognized by American Film Institute in these lists:

- 2004: AFI's 100 Years...100 Songs:
  - "The Prayer" – Nominated

== Adaptations ==
=== Stage adaptation ===
Prior to the release of the film, Warner Bros. had plans to make a stage adaptation of the film that would tour around to different renaissance fairs throughout the United States, as well as a nightly fireworks show for Six Flags Great Adventure. Both shows were designed by SLG Design & Creative Talent and Steve Gilliam.

The touring aspect of the project was cancelled soon after the film's release due to poor box office performance and the tour's anticipated cost, but the nightly firework show did end up coming to fruition. Quest for Camelot Nights debuted at Six Flags Great Adventure in 1998, and ran through 2001.

The show told the story of the film, with much of the film's main characters appearing as live characters in the show. The film's musical numbers were acted out with scenes from the film displayed with projections onto the show's "water curtains".

=== Audiobook ===
The Quest for Camelot Audio Action-Adventure was a follow along audiobook based on the film. Released April 7, 1998, the interactive story features two new songs that were not included in the movie, Camelot and To Be a Knight. Initially announced in 1996, the audiobook was scheduled to be released October 1997, but was delayed until April 1998. The story was narrated by Val Bettin.

=== Video games ===
The first video game was titled Quest for Camelot and is an action-adventure video game developed by Titus Interactive and published by Nintendo for the Game Boy Color in 1998, and later was added to the Nintendo Switch Online service on September 5, 2023. A Nintendo 64 version of the game was planned, but was scrapped due to the film's performance at the box office. The second video game was titled Quest for Camelot: Dragon Games is a computer game developed by Knowledge Adventure, it gives the player the ability to explore Camelot after the events of the film. In addition to exploring the world, the player gets to raise a dragon egg and watch it grow.

== See also ==
- List of Warner Bros. theatrical animated features
- List of films based on Arthurian legend
