= Richard Lane Joynt =

- Born: 18 May 1866; Raheny, Dublin, Ireland
- Died: 8 April 1928 (aged 61); 84 Harcourt Street, Dublin
- Occupation: Orthopaedic surgeon

Richard Lane Joynt OBE (18 May 1866 - 8 April 1928) was an Irish orthopaedic surgeon, metallurgist, who pioneered the use of x-rays.

== Early life and family ==
Richard Lane Joynt was born at the Grange, Raheny, County Dublin on 18 May 1866. His parents were Jane (née Russell) and William Lane-Joynt, a barrister and mayor of Limerick in 1862 and Dublin in 1867. He had four brothers and a sister. His brother, William Russell, was a barrister and philatelist and Olympic shooter. Lane Joynt spent some of his childhood in Limerick, where his father trained as a solicitor. Through his father, he was a cousin of Augusta, Lady Gregory. Lane Joynt attended the Portora Royal School, Enniskillen, County Fermanagh and entered Trinity College Dublin, graduating with an LM diploma in 1889 and MB, BCh, BAO in 1890.

== Career ==
In 1891 he trained at the Vienna General Hospital, receiving his MD in 1893, and admitted as a fellow of the Royal College of Surgeons in Ireland (RCSI) in 1894 and elected to the County Dublin Infirmary and Meath Hospital. He served as a senior member of the RCSI council. Just two years after the invention of x-rays, Lane Joynt began experimenting with the new technology in 1897. As the dangers of radiation were not yet known, Lane Joynt's hands were scarred and often bandaged from exposure to radium. He was among the first radiologists appointed in Ireland in 1900, having been given the post at the Meath Hospital. From 1898 to 1906, he was medical officer for the Society for the Prevention of Cruelty to Children. He was published widely on medical research, including in the Dublin Journal of Medical Science. Much of these articles focused on his work using x-rays and their utility in the diagnosis and treatment of fractures and other injuries.

Lane Joynt also worked as a technician and metallurgist. Among his work in this area was the development of mobility apparatus for wounded World War I soldiers. These inventions resulted in his appointment as the general inspector of orthopaedic factories in Great Britain and Ireland after the war. In his own workshop, he created surgical instruments for procedures such as skin grafts, which were used in Meath Hospital by Lane Joynt and colleagues. During World War I, he served in the Royal Army Medical Corps as a lieutenant-colonel, and was an active member of the Red Cross. In recognition of his service, he was appointed an Officer of the Order of the British Empire (OBE) in the 1920 civilian war honours.

He died at his home, 84 Harcourt Street, Dublin, on 8 April 1928, and is buried in St John's churchyard, Limerick. Obituaries were published in the British Medical Journal and the Irish Journal of Medical Science.
