= Joseph Fogerty & Son =

Joseph Fogerty & Son was an Irish architectural firm active from the 1870s until 1887 in Limerick and throughout the west of Ireland. It was composed of Joseph Fogerty Sr. and his son Robert Fogerty.

== Works ==
- 1877 St Michael's Church of Ireland Church, Limerick, Pery Square
- 1879 Woodsdown House, Annacotty, Limerick
