= William Lane-Joynt =

Irish politician (1824–1895)

Lord Mayor of Dublin
- In office 1867–1868
- Preceded by: James Mackey
- Succeeded by: Sir William Carroll

Dublin Corporation
- In office 1864–1869

Mayor of Limerick
- In office 1862–1862

Personal details
- Born: 26 December 1824 Limerick, Ireland
- Died: 3 January 1895 (aged 70) Dublin, Ireland
- Party: Liberal
- Children: Richard Lane Joynt; William Russell Lane-Joynt

William Lane-Joynt (1824–1895) was an Irish barrister and politician, and is the only person to have been both Mayor of Limerick and Lord Mayor of Dublin.

== Early life and family ==
William Lane-Joynt was born in Limerick on 26 December 1824. His parents were Arabella (née Lane) and William Persse Joynt. His father was a merchant. On his paternal side, Lane-Joynt was a cousin of Augusta, Lady Gregory. He was sworn as a solicitor in 1843, having trained in Dublin under Sir Matthew Barrington. By the late 1840s, he had returned to Limerick, and established his practice at 15 Thomas Street and lived at 86 O'Connell Street. He married Jane Russell in 1854, and the couple had five sons and a daughter. One son, Richard, became a surgeon, and another, William, a barrister and philatelist.

== Career ==
=== Limerick ===
As a young man, Lane-Joynt was a Young Irelander, but later joined the Liberal party and was their chief Irish election agent. He was elected to Limerick Corporation for the Abbey Ward prior to being elected mayor in 1862. During his term, he refused a knighthood from George Howard, 7th Earl of Carlisle, the lord lieutenant. He was a Protestant, but he supported the Catholic clergy and improved tenants' rights as well as the foundation of a Catholic university and the disestablishment of the Church of Ireland. He did oppose Home Rule, which led to him resigning from the Liberal party in 1886. He was clerk of the crown for Limerick from 1857 to 1869, served as the Limerick Corporation's land agent and solicitor, and as a member of the Limerick Harbour Commissioners. In 1848 he was chair of the Limerick Celtic Society and in 1853 served as President of the Limerick Literary and Scientific Society. He was a patron of the Limerick Mechanics' Institute, providing funding for an evening adult school teacher. He proposed that a Limerick Athenaeum should be established, and bought the lease in 1854 of the former headquarters of St Michael's parish commissioners on Cecil Street. There he oversaw the construction of a lecture theatre that could hold 600 people. Opened in 1856, Lane-Joynt was the inaugural president of the Limerick Athenaeum. He later served as vice-president of the Association of Librarians, and saw the publication of Denis Florence MacCarthy's complete works in 1881.

=== Dublin ===
Lane-Joynt resigned in late 1863 from the Limerick Corporation, moving to Grange Abbey, Raheny, Dublin. He was elected to Dublin Corporation in for the Rotunda ward in 1864, initially as a councillor and then as an alderman. He sat on the Port and Docks Board, and from 1865 was Justice of the Peace for County Dublin and deputy lieutenant of Dublin. In 1867, he was elected Lord Mayor of Dublin. That year he attended the Great Exhibition in Paris and received the Legion of Honour by Napoleon III. In 1869, he resigned from the Dublin Corporation having been appointed the Crown and Treasury Solicitor, a position he held until its abolition in 1887. He had a residence at Grange Abbey, as well as at Lower Gardiner Street and Merrion Square.

In the early 1880s, Lane-Joynt sat on the Mansion House Relief Committee which oversaw the distribution of aid in the west of Ireland. Any residual funds were directed towards the building of landing slips and piers in the most dangerous fishing regions, under the direction of Lane-Joynt. He was also a member of the board of Irish Lights, and saw the construction of a lighthouse at the entrance to Kilronan Harbour, Inishmore.

=== County Clare ===
From 1873, he was estate agent for Henry White, 1st Baron Annaly, spending his summers in Clareville House, County Clare. There he often served on the local grand jury, and Keeper of the Hanaper and District Lieutenant for the county. From 1894, he was the county's High Sheriff. He advocated to White that he should provide his tenants with a free supply of water, which resulted in a public water fountain in Ballyvaughan being erected in 1875. He did also represent the White family in court, during the course of which a precedent was set that farms that could not be tilled were not governed by the Land Acts, which deprived many of the Whites' tenants' fair rent protections.

== Later life ==
Lane-Joynt suffered with bronchitis later in life, and spent his winters abroad. While holding a loaded revolver on 9 December 1894, the gun exploded and blew off his little finger. He underwent surgery, but died from complications on 3 January 1895, at his residence at 43 Merrion Square, Dublin. He buried in St John's churchyard, Limerick. A stained glass window commemorating Lane-Joynt was erected in St Patrick's Cathedral, Dublin.

Civic offices
Preceded by James Mackey	Lord Mayor of Dublin; 1867–1868	Succeeded by Sir William Carroll
