= James Mackey (mayor) =

Irish politician (1816–1892)

Lord Mayor of Dublin
- In office 1873–1874
- Preceded by: Robert Garde Durdin
- Succeeded by: Maurice Brooks
- In office 1866–1867
- Preceded by: Sir John Barrington
- Succeeded by: William Lane-Joynt

Personal details
- Born: 1816 Dublin, Ireland
- Died: 14 December 1892 (aged 75–76) Dublin, Ireland
- Party: Irish Liberal Party
- Spouse: Hannah Jones (m. 1847)

Sir James William Mackey (1816 – 14 December 1892) was an Anglo-Irish merchant and politician.

Mackey was the son of Stephen Mackey, a Dublin seed merchant, and Catherine Ward. He inherited his father's business in 1854. He was twice Lord Mayor of Dublin, in 1866 and 1873, firstly representing the Irish Liberal Party and secondly for the Irish Conservative Party. He was knighted in 1873. In 1880 Mackey served a term as Sheriff of Dublin City.

In 1847 he married Hannah James Sylvia Jones. Mackey owned 1,377 acres in County Cork. He was a lifelong member of the Royal Dublin Society.

== Arms ==
Coat of arms of James Mackey

Notes
Confirmed by John Bernard Burke, Ulster King of Arms, 20 August 1866.
Crest
Out of a mural crown a dexter hand grasping a dagger all Proper.
Escutcheon
Azure on a chevron Or between in chief two bears' heads couped Argent muzzled Gules and in base a civic crown of the second a roebuck's head erased between two hands couped at the wrist each holding a dagger all Proper.
Motto
Manu Forti

Civic offices
Preceded by Sir John Barrington	Lord Mayor of Dublin; 1866–1867	Succeeded by William Lane-Joynt
Preceded by Robert Garde Durdin	Lord Mayor of Dublin; 1873–1874	Succeeded by Maurice Brooks
