= William Russell Lane-Joynt =

Sport shooter, barrister, and philatelist

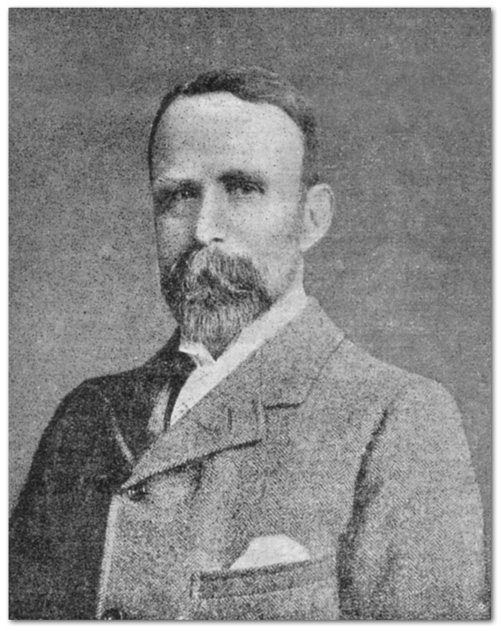
- William Russell Lane-Joynt as pictured in the December 1921 issue of the Stamp Collectors' Fortnightly

Personal information
- Born: 27 March 1855 Limerick, Ireland
- Died: 6 June 1921 (aged 66) Clonskeagh, Dublin, Ireland

Sport
- Sport: Sports shooting
Medal record
Men's shooting
Representing Great Britain
Olympic Games
Silver medal – second place	1908 London	Team running deer

William Russell Lane-Joynt (27 March 1855– 6 June 1921), born in Limerick, was an Irish barrister, philatelist and Olympic shooter. He founded the Irish Philatelic Society in Dublin. He assisted the Duke of Leinster to form his collection, which was bequeathed to the Dublin Museum of Science and Art. Lane-Joynt was one of only two Irish philatelists to be honoured by signing the Roll of Distinguished Philatelists.

== Life ==
He was the son of William Lane-Joynt, Mayor of Limerick (1862) and Lord Mayor of Dublin (1867). He had four brothers and a sister. One of his brothers was the surgeon and radiologist, Richard Lane Joynt. Educated at Windermere College, Wales, Lane-Joynt graduated with a B.A. and M.B. from Trinity College, Dublin in 1878. After attending King's Inns, Dublin, he was called to the bar as a barrister-at-law in April 1879. He married in 1882 and had two children, Evelyn and William (b.24 August 1886).

Lane-Joynt was Revolver Champion of Ireland four times and won a silver medal for shooting at the 1908 Summer Olympics, held in London, as a member of the Men's Running Target, Single Shot Great Britain team. He also competed in three other events but did not feature in the medals.

== Philately ==
Amongst Lane-Joynt's philatelic specialities were the line-engraved stamps of the British West Indies, Canada, Cape of Good Hope, Gold Coast, Great Britain, and the United States. He became a fellow of the Royal Philatelic Society London in 1889. He was founder member and first president of the Irish Philatelic Club, later renamed the Irish Philatelic Society, at its inception in 1901 and remained its president until 1920. He helped the Duke of Leinster assemble his Leinster Collection,. After the Duke's death, he became Honorary Curator of the collection that was bequeathed to the Dublin Museum of Science and Art. In 1921, he was invited to sign the Roll of Distinguished Philatelists as one of the initial 25 candidates but was unable to do so due to ill health. He remains only one of two Irishmen invited to sign the roll.

At the time of his death in 1921, a portion of his collection was on display at the Dublin Museum of Science and Art. He bequeathed that to the museum to be added to the Duke of Leinster's collection, which added to the collection's interest. The balance of his collection was sold at auction in London in January 1922 and later auctions.
