= David William Mitchell =

British painter (1813–1859)

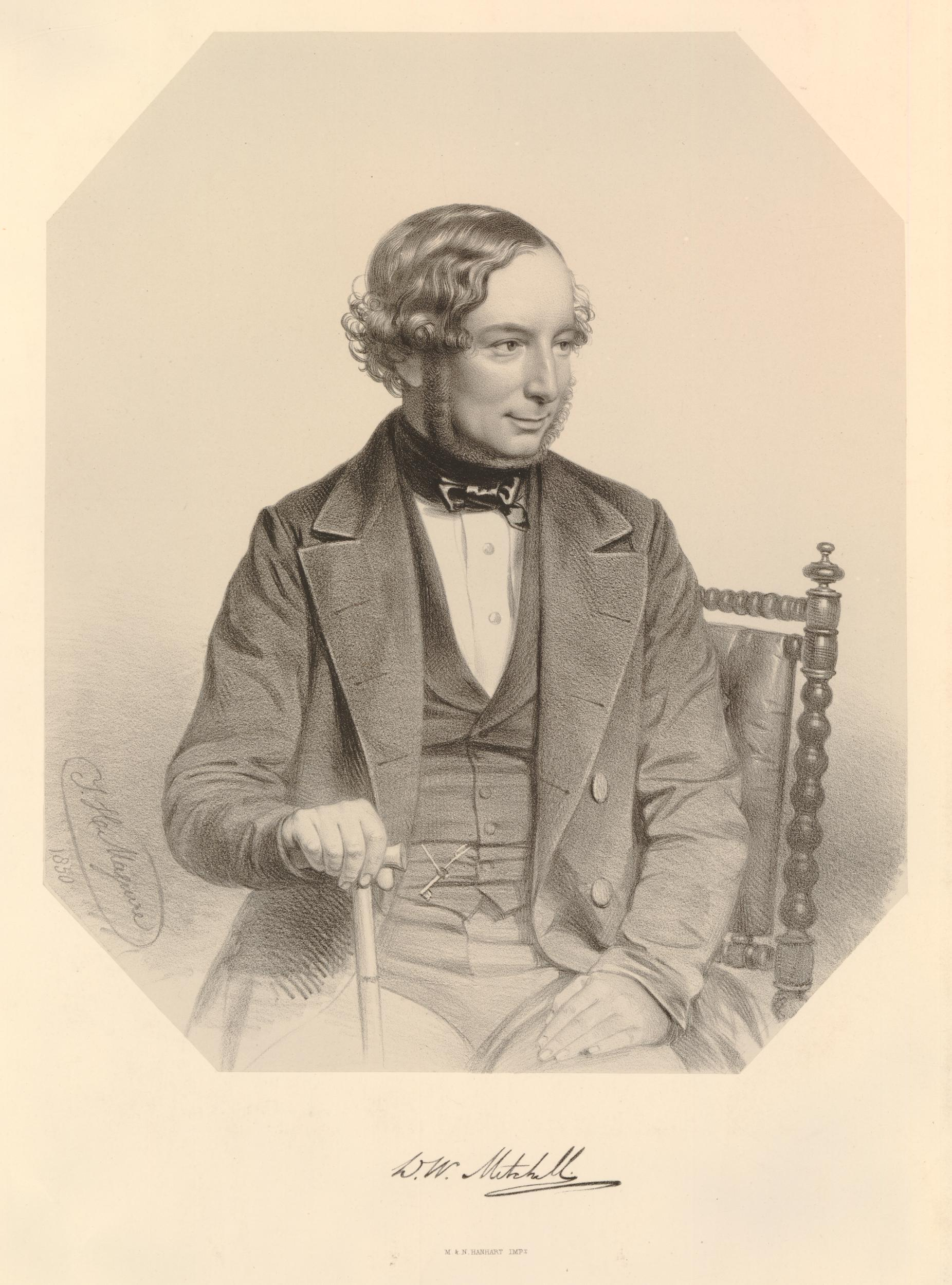
Portrait of David William Mitchell, half-length sitting in chair, head turned and looking to right, stick in his right hand. 1850

David William Mitchell (4 August 1813 – 1 November 1859) was an English zoologist and illustrator.

== Life and work ==
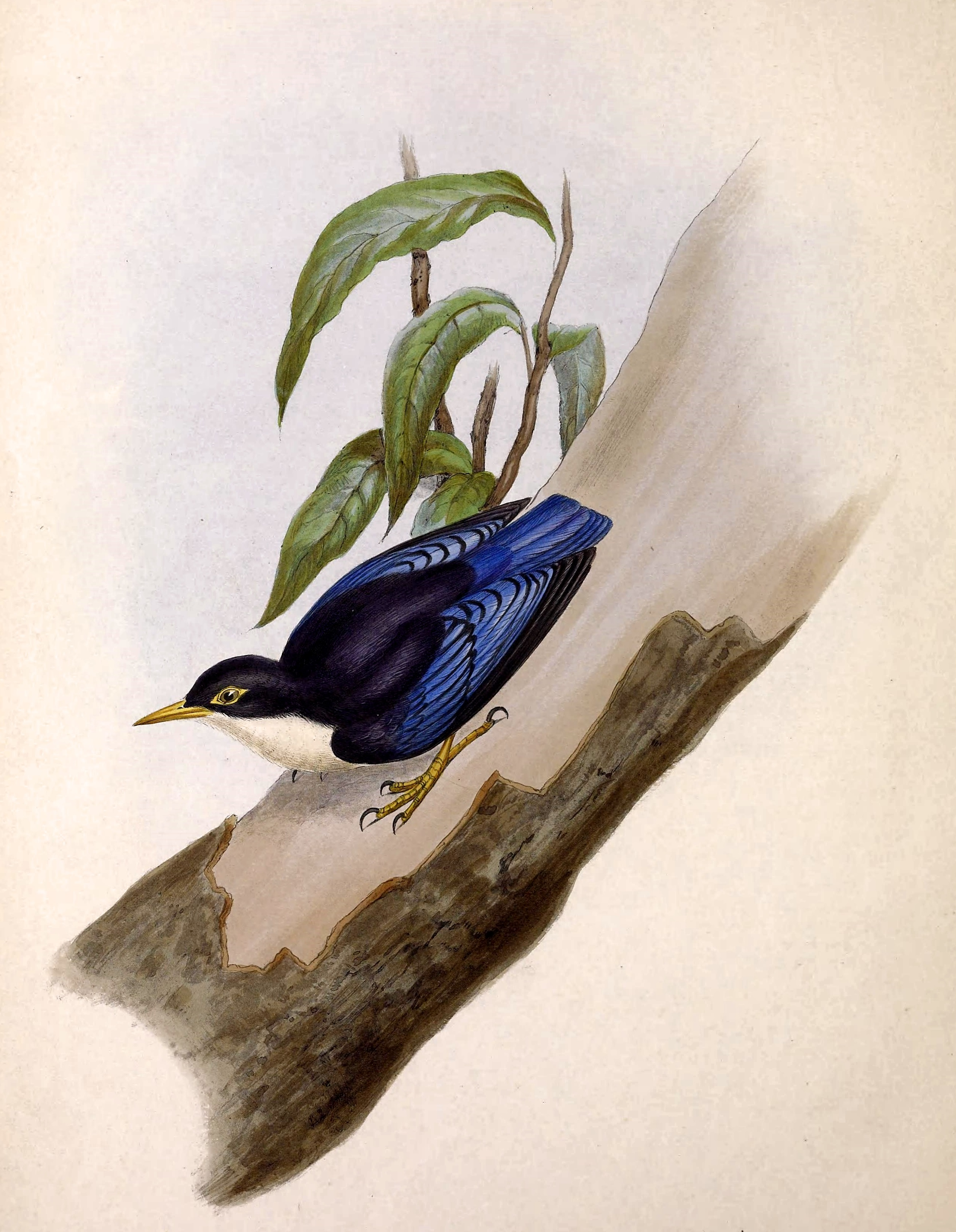
Illustration of Sitta azurea nigriventer by Mitchell in The Genera of Birds, 1844–1849

Mitchell was born in Chalfont St. Peter, Buckinghamshire, the eldest son of Alexander Mitchell of Gerard's Cross. He matriculated at Christ Church, Oxford in 1832, graduating B.A. in 1836.

Residing in Bloomsberry Terrace, London, he married Prudence Philips Willes, eldest daughter of the Rev'd Edward Willes of Walcot, near Bath, Somerset on 30 October 1837.

Mitchell illustrated George Robert Gray's Genera of Birds, but finding himself too busy with his work for the ZSL, he employed the German illustrator Joseph Wolf as his assistant on the project.

Mitchell was elected into the Linnean Society of London in November 1843. Mitchell was the first paid secretary of the Zoological Society of London (ZSL), taking up the post between 10 February 1847 and 6 April 1859, instigating the construction of the first public marine aquarium in the Regent's Park Zoological Gardens, which opened on 22 May 1853. He is credited with rescuing the London zoo financially by publishing attractive images of a few "star" animals, thus greatly increasing the number of visitors in the late 1840s.

Mitchell was a collector and dealer in skins and eggs, and for a time lived in Penzance, Cornwall.

Resigning his post as secretary of the ZSL on 6 April 1859, he became Aquarium Director of the Jardin d'Acclimatation in Paris, but died on 1 November 1859 (shot himself), only months after taking up the position, and was succeeded there by William Alford Lloyd.

Preceded by William Ogilby	Secretary of the Zoological Society of London; 1847–1859	Succeeded by Philip Sclater
