= Robert Garde Durdin =

Irish politician (1820–1878)

Lord Mayor of Dublin
- In office 1872–1873
- Preceded by: John Campbell
- Succeeded by: Sir James Mackey

Personal details
- Born: c. 1820 County Carlow, Ireland
- Died: 19 October 1878 (aged 57–58)
- Party: Irish Conservative Party
- Spouse: Fidelia Durdin

Robert Garde Durdin (c. 1820 – 19 October 1878) was an Irish Conservative Party politician, who served as Lord Mayor of Dublin from 1872 to 1873.

He was a member of Dublin Corporation, and in 1872 became Lord Mayor of Dublin.

Durdin was married to Fidelia Durdin. Durdin died on 19 October 1878.

Civic offices
Preceded by John Campbell	Lord Mayor of Dublin; 1872–1873	Succeeded by Sir James Mackey
