= Athenaeus (disambiguation) =

Athenaeus (/æθɪˈniːəs/; Ancient Greek: Ἀθήναιος) may refer to:

- Athenaeus of Sparta, Spartan officer of the 5th century BC
- Athenaeus (officer), an officer of Antigonus I Monophthalmus in the Third War of the Diadochi who led a campaign against the Nabataeans in 312 BC
- Athenaeus of Cyzicus, 4th century BCE mathematician and geometer
- Athenaeus, son of Attalus I
- Athenaeus of Macedonia, 2nd century general
- Athenaeus, a notable sculptor of ancient Greece who lived around the time of the 155th Olympiad, that is, 160 BCE
- Athenaeus (musician), Greek composer who flourished 128 BC
- Athenaeus, Cappadocian man who had been banished from there by queen Athenais Philostorgos II, but was restored through the influence of Cicero in 51 BC, as he describes in his Epistulae ad Familiares
- Athenaeus (rhetorician), rhetorician of the 1st and 2nd centuries BCE
- Athenaeus Mechanicus, a Peripatetic writer of the 1st century BC, author of On Machines
- Athenaeus (poet), epigrammatic poet of unknown date
- Athenaeus of Attalia, physician of the Pneumatist School who practiced at Rome in the 1st century AD
- Athenaeus, of Naucratis in Egypt, Greek rhetorician and grammarian, 2nd and beginning of the 3rd century AD
- Athenaeus, a stoic philosopher of the 3rd century CE, mentioned by Porphyrius in his biography of the philosopher Plotinus
- Athenaeus, an Epicurean philosopher mentioned by Diogenes Laërtius in his Lives and Opinions of Eminent Philosophers. His time is unknown.
