= Quest for Camelot Nights =

Defunct stage show

Six Flags Great Adventure
- Area: Switlik Lake
- Status: Closed
- Opening date: May 9, 1998
- Closing date: 2001

Ride statistics
- Attraction type: Live stage show
- Designer: Adirondack Scenic, Inc.
- Theme: Quest for Camelot
- Music: Patrick Doyle
- Wheelchair accessible
- Assistive listening available

Quest for Camelot Nights was a stage show performed on Switlik Lake at Six Flags Great Adventure from May 9, 1998 through 2001. The show told the story of the 1998 Warner Bros. animated film Quest for Camelot, featuring music and lyrics by Patrick Doyle as well as fireworks, lasers, and water projections.

== Development and history ==
Warner Bros. began developing live productions based on Quest for Camelot in 1996 while the film was still in production, the first of which was Quest for Camelot Nights.

For Quest for Camelot Nights to occupy the same space as the Lethal Weapon: Water Stunt Spectacular! on Switlik Lake, Lethal Weapon's boat and garage were modified and made double-sided so that they could be reversed every night in under an hour. At night, The boat became Merlin's castle, and the garage became a platform. A floating iceberg was also re-used from a previous show and re-painted to look like a rock jutting out of the water, which was hidden behind the boat during the day.

The show premiered at the start of the 1998 season, and was originally only intended to run through Labor Day, but its popularity ended up making Six Flags have it return for three more seasons, with the show's final performance happening in 2001.

== Cancelled tour ==
Other than Quest for Camelot Nights, Warner Bros. was also planning a touring live production to coincide with the release of Quest for Camelot. The tour was supposed to debut at Six Flags Fiesta Texas in 1998, and then travel to different renaissance fairs throughout the United States. The project was cancelled soon after the film underperformed at the box office. Quest for Camelot only made back $38 million of its $40 million budget, making it a box office bomb.
