= Mike Nguyen =

American artist

Mike Nguyen is a Vietnamese-American artist who worked as a Supervising Animator on Warner Bros.' Quest for Camelot, The Iron Giant, and Osmosis Jones but is best known for creating his own animated feature My Little World.

== Biography ==
Mike Nguyen received his BFA in character animation at the California Institute of the Arts in 1988. Since then, he has worked in the feature animation film industry for over 10 years as an animator, for major studios such as Disney, DreamWorks, and Warner Bros. On August 2004, Nguyen self-published Issa, a picture book.
