= John Frederick Fogerty =

Irish architect and engineer

- Born: 1863; Limerick, Ireland
- Died: 12 June 1938 (aged 74–75); Lusaka, Northern Rhodesia
- Occupations: architect, engineer, borough surveyor, veteran

John Frederick Fogerty ARIBA (1863–1938), was an Irish architect and engineer active late 19th-century Limerick, London, Shropshire, Bournemouth, Pretoria, and Zambia.

== Life ==
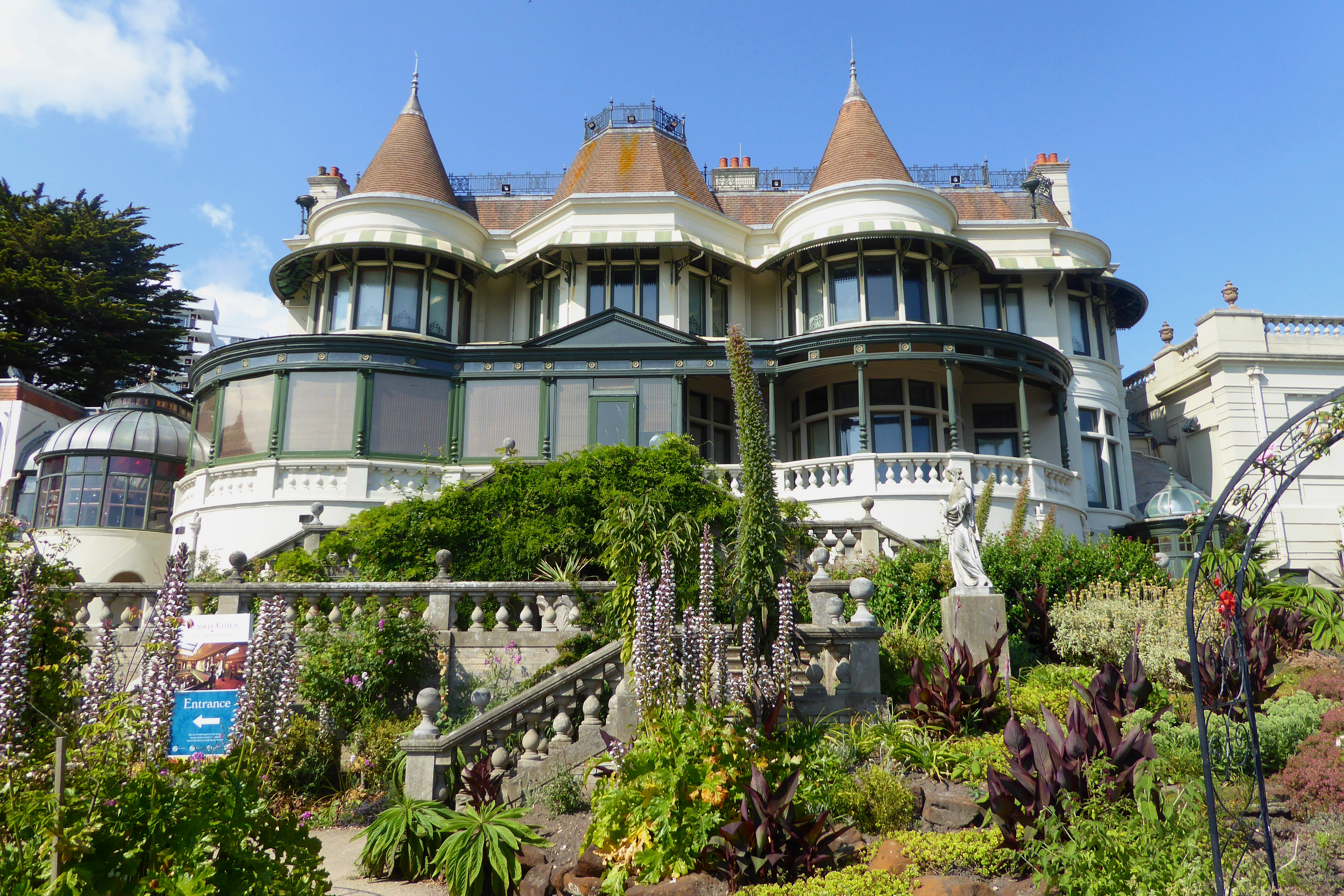
Frontage of the Russell-Cotes Art Gallery and Museum (formerly East Cliff Hall)

Born in Limerick in 1863, he was the son of architect William Fogerty, grandson of architect and engineer John Fogerty (engineer), and nephew of engineer and novelist Joseph Fogerty. He earned a bachelor's degree in engineering from Queen's College, Cork in 1883, and attended the South Kensington Art School and the Metropolitan School of Art, Dublin from 1884. He also attended Trinity College Dublin (dates unknown), and the Royal University in Dublin graduating with a BA in English.

He was articled to Sir Thomas Drew, and went on to work for the Great Western Railway in Paddington, London in the office of the chief engineer, and as an assistant to an engineer at the Lillenhall engineering company in Shropshire. In 1889, he established his office at Wellington, and entered into partnership with Reginald George Pinder in Bournemouth in 1893, later amalgamating Pearce & Parnell of Bournemouth in 1902. Fogerty had qualified as an architect in 1894, and was elected as an Associate of the Royal Institute of British Architects (ARIBA) the same year.

He emigrated with his wife to South Africa in 1914 and enlisted at the outbreak of the World War I. He served time in South Africa, being the first soldier wounded in the operation in South West Africa, the Isle of Wight training recruits, in Palestine possibly as an assistant to Lord Allenby before he was invalided out and posted to Poona, India. During the interwar period, he worked as an engineer in Pretoria's Public Works Department before becoming a borough surveyor in Lusaka, Northern Rhodesia, in 1926.

Fogerty was also a painter, and exhibited with the Royal Hibernian Academy in Dublin from 1886 to 1895. He died at his home, Kilfinane, in Lusaka on 12 June 1938. Fogerty and his wife, Kate Isabella Veronica (née Morse), had three daughters, Dulcie, Geraldine, and Vera.

His works include East Cliff Hall, Bournemouth (1897–1907) mansion for Merton and Annie Russell-Cotes.
