= Iași Athenaeum =

Public cultural institution in Iași, Romania

Iași National Athenaeum
- Ateneul Național din Iași (Romanian)
- Tătărași Athenaeum
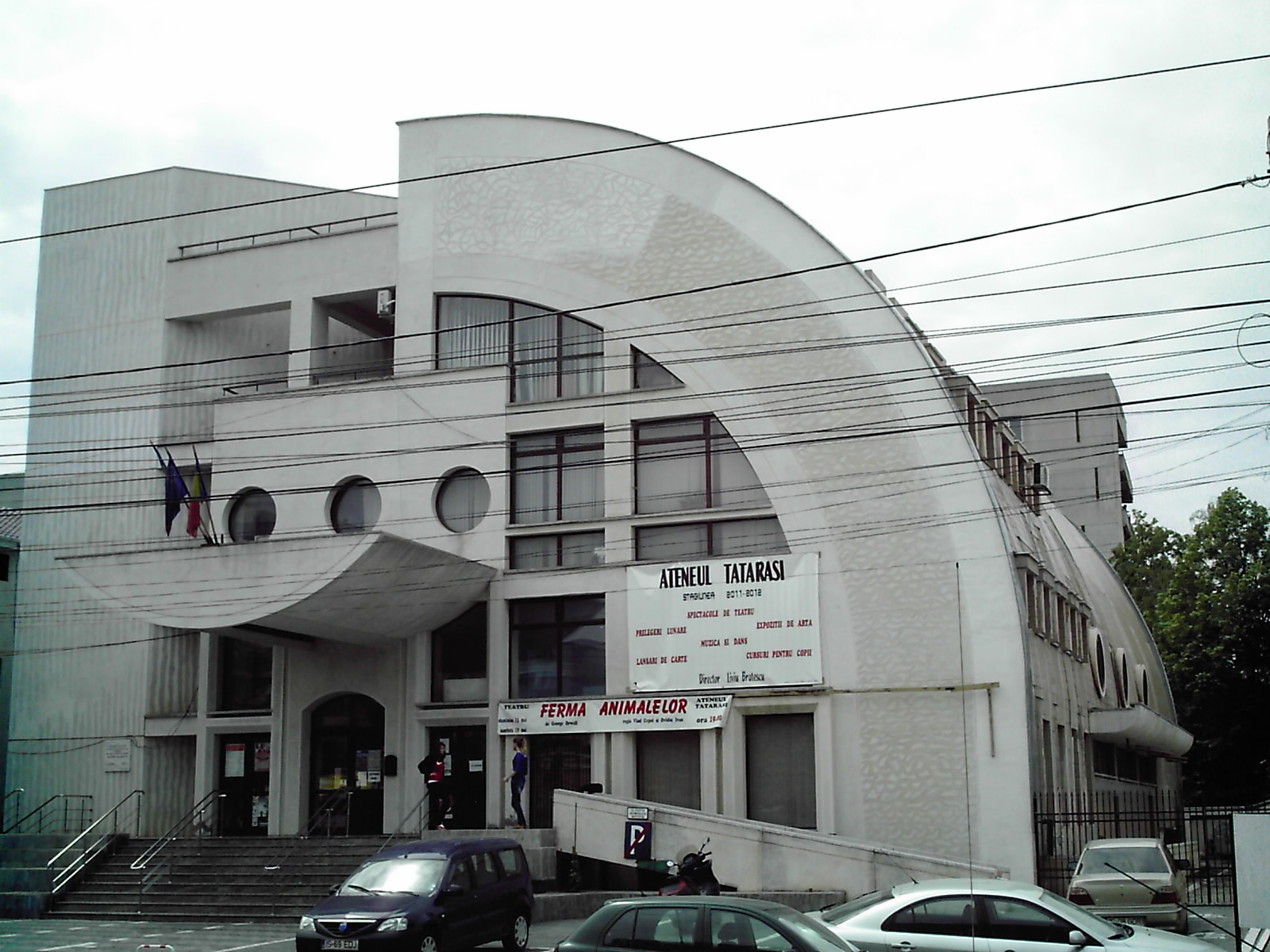
- Interactive map of Iași National Athenaeum
- Address: Iași; Romania
- Capacity: Radu Beligan Hall 270 seats Galerii Hall 100 seats
- Current use: live theatre, concerts, library, readings

Construction
- Opened: 25 April 1920
- Rebuilt: 1998-2003

Website
- http://ateneuiasi.ro/

Iași National Athenaeum (Romanian: Ateneul Național din Iași), also known as Tătărași Athenaeum, is a public cultural institution in Iași, Romania. It was founded on 25 April 1920, as Tătărași Popular Athenaeum, under the management of Constantin N. Ifrim.

The institution produces its own theatre performances, hosts various concerts, films, conferences, exhibitions and cultural events, and houses a public library.
