= Athenaeus of Macedonia =

Ancient Spartan general

Athenaeus (Ancient Greek: Ἀθήναιος) of Macedonia was a Seleucid general in the 2nd century BCE. He served under the king Antiochus VII Sidetes. During the winter of 130-129 BCE, he gained a reputation for mistreating the local Babylonian villages when he quartered his troops there.

In 129 BCE, Athenaeus accompanied the king Antiochus on his expedition against the Parthians, and he was one of the first to retreat in the battle in which Antiochus lost his life.

Athenaeus died in his retreat march. Because of how he had mistreated the local villages when he was in command of his armies, none of the villages to whom he fled would help him. They all shut their gates to him, and refused him food and water. He wandered up and down the country, eventually dying of starvation.
