= Joseph Fogerty =

Irish engineer

- Born: 7 April 1831; Limerick, Ireland
- Died: 2 September 1899 (aged 68); London
- Occupations: Civil engineer; architect; novelist

Joseph Fogerty, CE, FRIBA, (1831–1899) was an Irish civil engineer, architect, and novelist active in mid-to-late-nineteenth-century Limerick, London, and Vienna.

== Life ==
Born in Limerick on 7 April 1831, Fogerty's parents were Elizabeth and John Fogerty, a civil engineer. He was the brother and uncle of architects William Fogerty and John Frederick Fogerty, respectively.

Fogerty studied under his father in Limerick before entering the University College London in 1856 to study civil engineering. He worked on the Severn Valley, London metropolitan railways as a surveyor, as well as the Much Wenlock, and the Coalbrookdale and Craven Arms lines. Fogerty was elected a member of the Institution of Civil Engineers in 1863.

Later, he worked in London for Sir John Fowler. From 1865, he worked as an architect, constructing factories, water and steampower mills in Ireland, private houses around London, and designing an elevated railway in Vienna. He was elected Fellow of the Royal Institute of British Architects on 9 February 1880 after being proposed by Henry Currey, Edwin Nash and Charles Barry.

He was also an author, with three of his novels, Lauterdale, Caterina and Countess Irene, being published.

Fogerty died at his house, Enderby, in Sydenham on 2 September 1899. He married Hannah Cochrane (died 1910), of Limerick and they had a daughter, Elsie Fogerty (born in Sydenham on 16 December 1865), who became a notable teacher of speech.
