= William Fogerty =

- Born: c.1834
- Died: 22 May 1878
- Occupation: Architect

William Fogerty, FRIAI, FRIBA, AAI was an Irish architect active in mid-nineteenth-century Limerick, London, New York City and Dublin.

Born in Limerick, where he was baptised on 6 May 1834, he studied in the early 1850s at Queen's College, Cork. He moved to Dublin in the early 1860s, to London and then New York in the early 1870s, and back to Dublin in 1875. His offices were at 23 Harcourt Street, Dublin. He died of smallpox at the age of forty-four in 1878. Architects in his family included his father, John Fogerty of Limerick, his brother Joseph Fogerty of London, and his son, John Frederick Fogerty of Dublin.
