= The Athenaeum (South Africa) =

Historical South African building in Nelson Mandela Bay, built in 1896

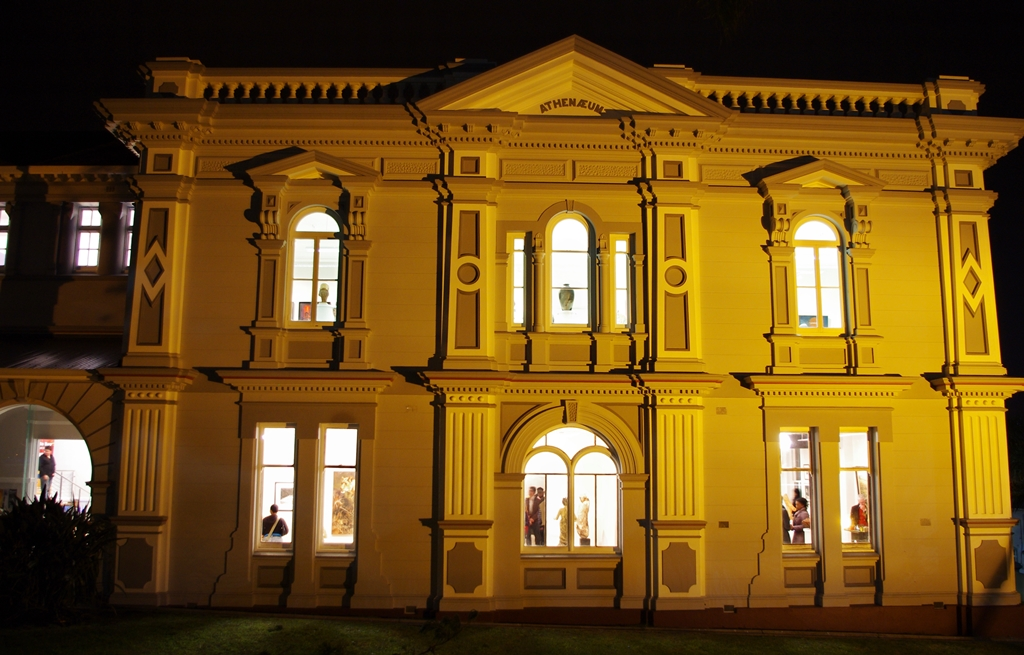
- The facade of The Athenaeum
- Location: Nelson Mandela Bay (Eastern Cape)
- Coordinates: 33°57′51.17″S 25°37′12.49″E
- Designer: George William Smith
- Type: Victorian
- Material: Stone
- Completion date: 1896
- Website: www.theathenaeum.co.za

The Athenaeum (an institution for the promotion of literary or scientific learning) building is at the heart of a burgeoning creative industry in Port Elizabeth. It is situated at the corner of Castle Hill and Belmont Terrace in Nelson Mandela Bay. The building aims to cultivate, develop and promote the culture, heritage and arts of the Eastern Cape. It was opened on 26 July 1896 and was designed by George William Smith. It was declared a national monument in 1980 and is listed as one of the provincial heritage sites of Port Elizabeth.

== Architecture ==
The Athenaeum was erected during the height of the Victorian era thus the designer, George William Smith, designed the building in a typically Victorian manner. It is a two-storey building with two distinct sections which were opened in 1896 and 1901 respectively. The Belmont Terrace facade has two wings which are joined by a central arched entrance porch, which is a classic of the Victorian style. The building has elements of 19th century neoclassicism and the architectural style used was Edwardian Baroque.

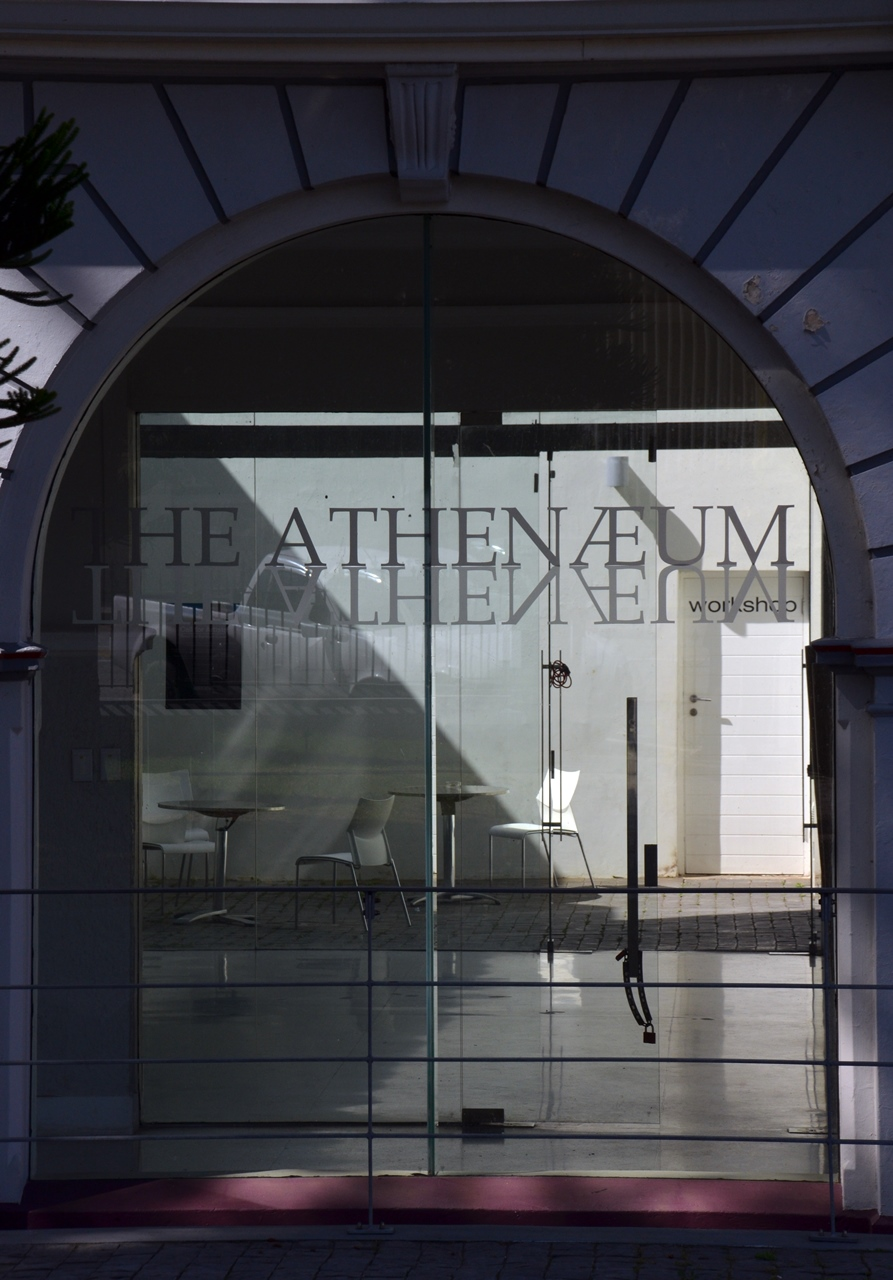
Entrance of The Athenaeum

=== History ===
In the 1850s, a group of intellectuals and willing citizens in the area of Algoa Bay came together to form the Athenaeum Society with the aim of promoting cultural, artistic and scientific activities within the town. The formation of this society was largely motivated by the lack of public entertainment within their region.

Committee members from the local library, the Athenaeum Society and the municipality held a meeting on 20 October 1856 to appeal to the colonial government to accord land to erect a Town Hall, which would accommodate municipal offices, a library, a museum and an athenaeum (place of further learning). A Town Hall was erected in 1858, which secured a home for the Athenaeum Society. Thus the society initially operated out of a space in the Town Hall but, as the library and museum grew and expanded into the space which the Athenaeum Society occupied, the society was forced to cease all activities in that space.

In 1882 an Art School was founded in Port Elizabeth. The number of its members grew exponentially so new premises were sought after. In 1891 Dr Hewitt, the founder of the Young Men's Institute, was also looking for premises for his society. In that very year the Photographic Society and Naturalist Society were founded and also sought premises in which to operate. The four societies thus came together to reinvigorate the Athenaeum.

The Town Council subsequently granted the new Athenaeum some council land and offered to erect a building if each society contributed the equivalent of €1000, which they did. An agreement was signed that stated that the building would remain the property of the Town Council, but would be made available to the societies, rate free. It also stipulated that the Athenaeum Council was responsible for the interior maintenance of the building whilst the municipality was responsible for the exterior. The Athenaeum Council, together with further funding from the Town Council, erected The Athenaeum in 1896. Since its opening in 1896, the Athenaeum has been home to numerous creative societies and leveraged off partnerships with the Mandela Bay Development Agency (MBDA), the Arts Journey, the National Arts Festival, Nelson Mandela Metropolitan University and Nelson Mandela Bay Tourism.

==== 1900s ====
In 1946, the Port Elizabeth Music and Dramatic Society (PEMADS) rented and renovated the Loubser Hall into a theatre, which is known today as the Ford Little Theatre. In the early 2000s the Athenaeum building went into a state of dilapidation and closed down. The Mandela Bay Development Agency (MBDA) took over the building in 2010 and started renovations. The Athenaeum and Ford Little Theatre were reopened in 2012.

==== Present day ====
The Athenaeum serves as a cradle of diverse activities within the arts industry. It showcases both national and international art exhibitions, live performances, art interventions and theatre shows. A number of emerging creatives hold office and studio space within the building. It is considered a fusion of new South African art and old South African design. To ensure sustainability, The Athenaeum also offers services such as venue hire, exhibition hosting and curation, event management, bar services, marketing and promotion and service provider management.

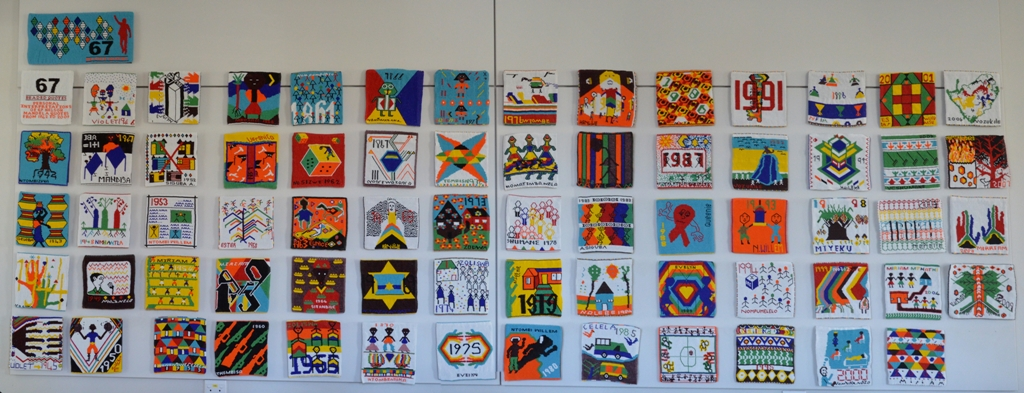
Beaded quotes in The Athenaeum

===== Ford Little Theatre =====
This venue is a stage for many creative industry pursuits, from live theatre productions and shows to live concerts, film screenings, conferences, debates and book launches.
