= Athenaeum (fort) =

Coordinates: 37°16′38″N 22°15′32″E

Athenaeum or Athenaion (Ancient Greek: Ἀθηναῖον), was a fortress in the south of ancient Arcadia, and in the territory of Megalopolis. It is described by Plutarch as a position in advance of the Lacedaemonian frontier (ἐμβολὴ τῆς Λακωνικῆς), and near Belemina. It was fortified by Spartan king Cleomenes III in 224 BCE, and was frequently taken and retaken in the wars between the Achaean League and the Spartans.

Its site is west of Belemina.
