= Athenaeum (Arcadia) =

Coordinates: 37°16′38″N 22°15′32″E

Athenaeum or Athenaion (Ancient Greek: Ἀθηναῖον), was a town in the south of ancient Arcadia, and in the territory of Megalopolis. Pausanias writes that it was on the road from Megalopolis to Asea, and 20 stadia from the latter.

Its site is near the modern Athenaion/Alika.
