= John Fogerty (engineer) =

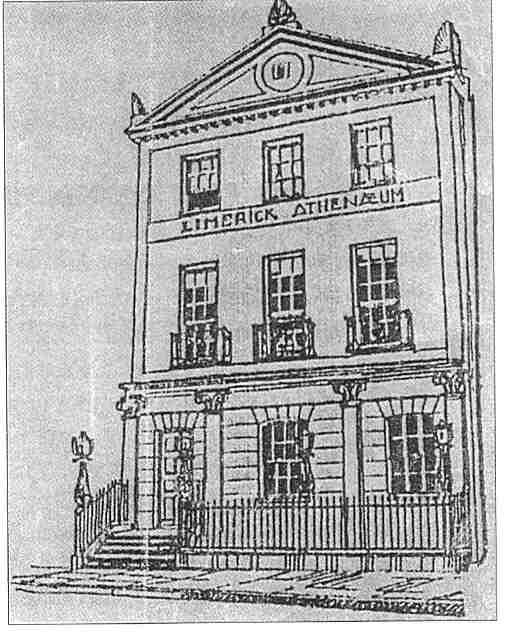
- Occupations: Civil Engineer, Architect, Millwright, Builder
- Known for: Architect of the Limerick Athenaeum

John Fogerty was an Irish millwright, architect, builder, and civil engineer, active in early to mid-19th-century Limerick. He was the brother of Joseph Fogerty Sr. and the father of engineer and novelist Joseph Fogerty of London, architect William Fogerty of Dublin, and grandfather of architect John Frederick Fogerty. He retired as an architect sometime between 1870 and 1879.

== Works ==
- Limerick Athenaeum
- 1849-1850 (Proposed) New Limerick Custom House for Commissioners of Customs, on the site of Mountkennett Mills (the Old Custom House is now the Hunt Museum).
- He is the likely builder of St. John's Square, Limerick.
