= German Athenaeum =

Historic association of expats in London

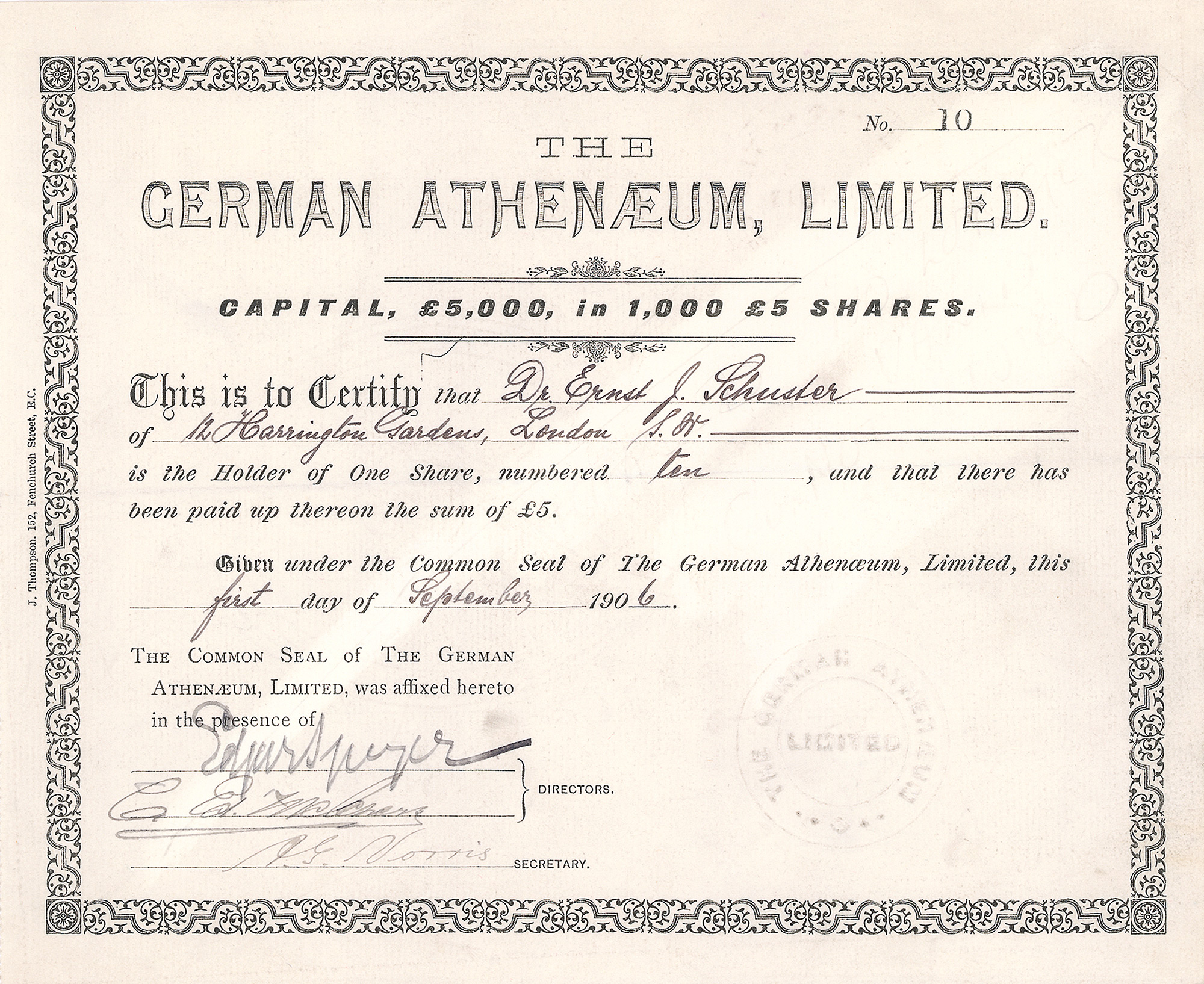
Share of The German Athenæum, Limited (de:Deutscher Verein für Kunst und Wissenschaft London), issued for Dr. Ern[e]st J[oseph] Schuster (1850-10 December 1924), banker, barrister-at-law (King's Counsel) and the last hon. president of the club

The German Athenaeum (German: Deutscher Verein für Kunst und Wissenschaft; "The German Association for Art and Science") was founded in 1869 by German artists and writers, with Gottfried Kinkel playing a key role. It was an elitist association of Germans in London who belonged to the middle to upper social class. This is reflected in the membership fees, which were quite high for the time: After a one-off membership payment of initially 15 guineas, scientists, artists and authors paid 4 guineas per year, while all other members paid 6 guineas per year. Membership was later acquired through the purchase of a share certificate, 1,000 of which were issued with a face value of £5 each.

At the turn of the century, the association had around 430 members, which by 1910 had grown to just under 600. Lectures, concerts, exhibitions and the like were held regularly in order to establish networks of relationships. These took place in the club's club rooms, which were initially located at 93 Mortimer Street and from around 1908 at 19 Stratford Place.

The clubhouse had to be closed in September 1914 due to strong anti-German sentiments that arose at the beginning of the First World War. According to The Times, the association was dissolved on its own initiative on October 24, 1914. It was removed from the police register shortly thereafter.

== Sources ==
- Deutscher Verein für Kunst und Wissenschaft London (Hg.) (1873). Jahresbericht 1873. London: Selbstverlag.
- Deutscher Verein für Kunst und Wissenschaft London (Hg.) (1873). Satzungen des Deutschen Vereins für Kunst und Wissenschaft in London. London: Selbstverlag.
- Deutscher Verein für Kunst und Wissenschaft London (Hg.) (1875). Mitgliederliste / Deutscher Verein für Kunst und Wissenschaft in London. London: Selbstverlag.
- Deutscher Verein für Kunst und Wissenschaft London (Hg.) (1876). Verein für Kunst und Wissenschaft. London: Selbstverlag.
- Deutscher Verein für Kunst und Wissenschaft London (Hg.) (1911). German Athenæum in London. Jahresbericht 1910. London: Selbstverlag.
- Katscher, Leopold (1887). 'German Life in London'. In: The Nineteenth Century. A Monthly Review. Edited by James Knowles. London: Henry S. King & Co. S. 726–741.
- Panayi, Panikos (Hg.) (1996). Germans in Britain since 1500. London & Rio Grande, Ohio: Hambledon Press.
