= List of works by Philip de László =

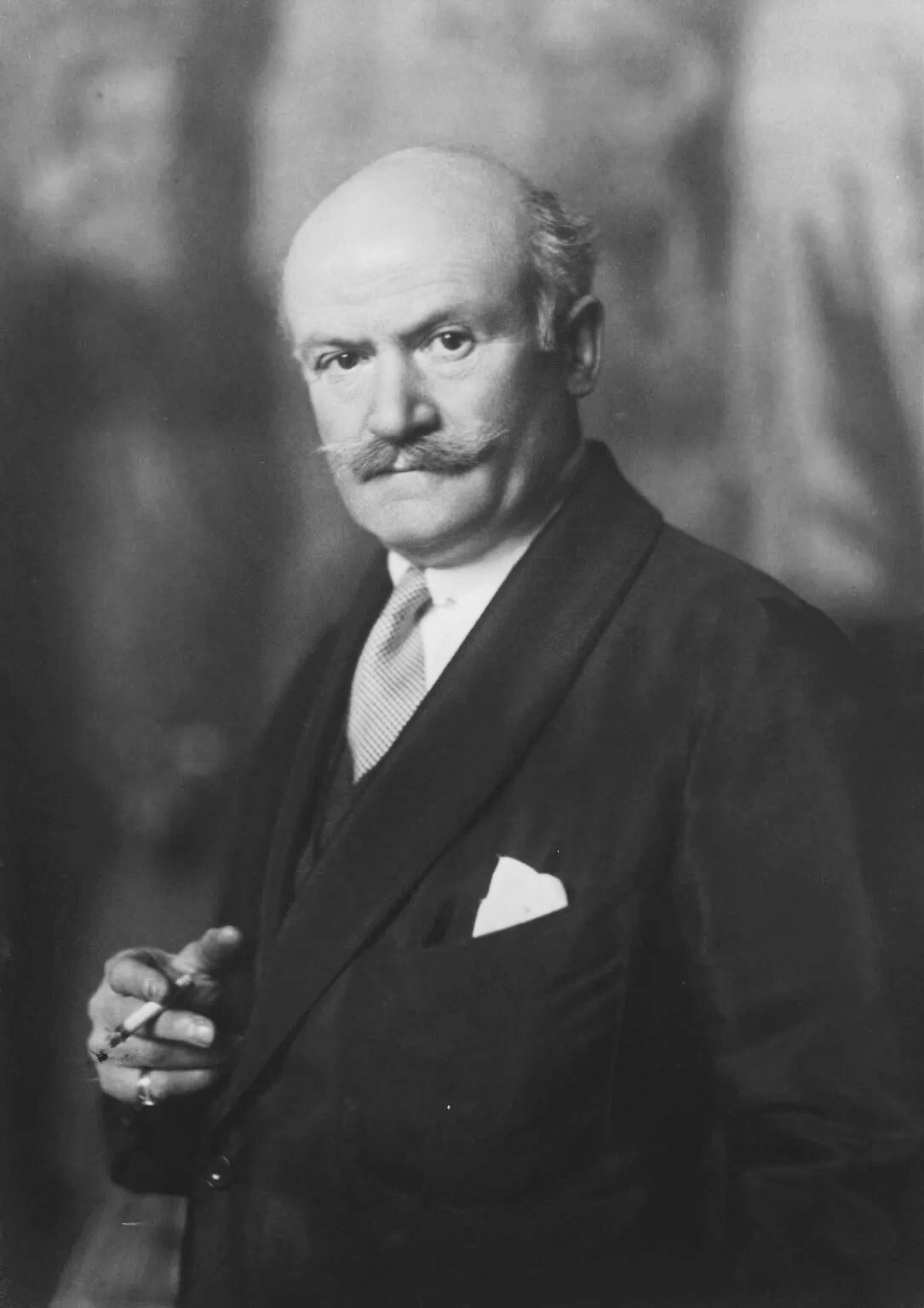
De László in 1928

Philip de László was an Anglo-Hungarian painter known particularly for his portraits of royal and aristocratic personages. He became a British subject in 1914.

== Works ==
=== 1891–1899 ===
Painting	Name/Subject	Year	Type	Current Location
	The Storyteller	1891	Portrait	Hungarian National Gallery
	Princess Marie Louise of Bourbon-Parma	1894	Portrait	Private
	Ferdinand I of Bulgaria	1894	Portrait	
	Ignaz Wechselmann	1894	Portrait	
	Bohuslav, Count Chotek of Chotkow and Wognin	1895	Portrait	Museum und Kunstsammlung Schloss Hinterglauchau
	At Vesper Bell	1895	Portrait	
	Count Albert Apponyi	1897	Portrait	Hungarian National Museum
	Victor II, Duke of Ratibor	1898	Portrait	
	Princess Leopoldine of Ratibor, née von Lobkowicz	1898	Portrait	
	Emperor Franz Joseph I of Austria	1899	Portrait	Hungarian National Museum
	Empress Elisabeth of Austria (posthumous portrait)	1899	Portrait	Hungarian National Museum
	The Duchess of Ratibor, née Countess Maria Breunner-Enkevoith	1899	Portrait	
	Irma Fürstin zu Fürstenberg, née Countess Schönborn-Buchheim	1899	Portrait	Fürstenberg collections
	Maximilian Egon II, Prince of Fürstenberg	1899	Portrait	Fürstenberg collections
	Maximilian Egon II, Prince of Fürstenberg	1899	Portrait	
	Princess Charlotte of Prussia, Duchess of Saxe-Meiningen	1899	Portrait	
	Bernhard III, Duke of Saxe-Meiningen	1899	Portrait	
	Princess Charlotte of Prussia, Duchess of Saxe-Meiningen	1899	Portrait	
	Augusta Victoria of Schleswig-Holstein, German Empress and Queen of Prussia	1899	Portrait	
	Catherine, Baroness d'Erlanger	1899	Portrait	Messum's Fine Art

=== 1900–1909 ===
Painting	Name/Subject	Year	Type	Current Location
	Cardinal Mariano Rampolla	1900	Portrait	Hungarian National Gallery
	Pope Leo XIII (Note: First version of the painting commissioned by the Hungarian government for the Pontiff's Jubilee in 1900, rejected by both the sitter and the artist, and remained in de László's possession until his death in 1937, when was donated to the Vatican Museums.)	1900	Portrait	Vatican Museums
	Pope Leo XIII	1900	Portrait	Hungarian National Gallery
	Sir George White	1900	Portrait	Royal Collection
	Princess Maria Teresa of Bourbon-Two Sicilies	1900	Portrait	
	Prince John-Henry XI, Duke of Pless	1900	Portrait	Museum of Pszczyna Castle
	Princess Mathilde, Duchess of Pless	1900	Portrait	Private
	Alice Barbi	1901	Portrait	
	Artúr Görgei	1901	Portrait	Hungarian National Gallery
	Artúr Görgei	1901	Portrait	Private
	János Fadrusz	1901	Portrait	Hungarian National Gallery
	Max Feilchenfeld	1902	Portrait	
	Marguerite-Alexandrine, Duchess of Gramont (Note: Marguerite-Alexandrine, Duchess of Gramont (née Marguerite-Alexandrine von Rothschild).)	1902	Portrait	
	Elisabeth, Duchess of Clermont-Tonnerre (Note: Elisabeth, Duchess of Clermont-Tonnerre (née Elisabeth de Gramont).)	1902	Portrait	Musée national du Château de Pau
	Marquise Hélie de Noailles (Note: Marquise Hélie de Noailles (née Corisande Emma Louise Ida de Gramont).)	1902	Portrait	
	Antoine XI-Agénor, 11th Duke of Gramont	1902	Portrait	
	Antoine XII-Armand, Duke of Guiche	1902	Portrait	Private
	Archduchess Maria Christina of Austria, Hereditary Princess of Salm-Salm	1902	Portrait	Museum Wasserburg Anholt
	Lucy de László (artist's wife)	1902	Portrait	Hugh Lane Gallery
	Archduchess Elisabeth Amalie of Austria	1903	Portrait	Collections of the Prince of Liechtenstein, Schloss Vaduz
	Joseph Joachim	1903	Portrait	
	Jan Kubelík	1903	Portrait	
	Self-portrait	1903	Portrait	
	Carl von Morawitz	1904	Portrait	
	Carlos I of Portugal	1905	Portrait	
	Lucy de László	1905	Portrait	Galleria Nazionale d'Arte Moderna, Rome
	Count Ernö Zichy	1905	Portrait	Private
	Heinrich Larisch-Moennich	1905	Portrait	
	Heinrich Larisch-Moennich	1905	Portrait	
	Dorothée, Countess Jean de Castellane (Note: La Comtesse Jean de Castellane (née Mademoiselle Dorothée de Talleyrand Périgord).)	1905	Portrait	Private
	Élaine Greffulhe, Duchess of Guiche (later Duchess of Gramont)	1905	Portrait	
	Baroness Leopoldine von Franckenstein	1905	Portrait	
	James Lowther, 1st Viscount Ullswater	1905	Portrait	Private
	Élisabeth, Countess Greffulhe (Note: Élisabeth, Countess Greffulhe (née Countess Élisabeth de Caraman-Chimay).)	c. 1905	Portrait	
	Prince Adolphus, Duke of Teck (later 1st Marquess of Cambridge)	1906	Portrait	The Collection of the Household Cavalry
	Margaret, Duchess of Teck (later Marchioness of Cambridge)	1906	Portrait	Private
	Princess Maria "May" zu Fürstenberg	1906	Portrait	
	Archduchess Elisabeth Marie of Austria	1906	Portrait	
	María de la Piedad de Yturbe y Scholtz (later von Hohenlohe-Langeburg)	1906	Portrait	Private
	Edgar Spiegl von Thurnsee	1906	Portrait	Private
	Count Leopold Berchtold	1906	Portrait	
	Adolf Ritter von Schenk	1906	Portrait	Bank Austria Creditanstalt Kunstsammlung Vienna
	Count Albert von Mensdorff-Pouilly-Dietrichstein	c. 1907	Portrait	National Portrait Gallery, London
	King Edward VII	1907	Portrait	Private
	Queen Alexandra	1907	Portrait	Private
	Princess Victoria	1907	Portrait	National Portrait Gallery, London
	Sir Alfred East	1907	Portrait	
	Lady Louise Mountbatten (later Queen of Sweden)	1907	Portrait	The Royal Collections, Stockholm
	Princess Alice of Battenberg	1907	Portrait	Private collection of Prince Philip, Duke of Edinburgh
	Infanta Antónia of Portugal	1907	Portrait	
	Princess Eleonore of Solms-Hohensolms-Lich, Grand Duchess of Hesse and Rhine	1907	Portrait	Hessischer Jägerhof Foundation
	Princess Eleonore of Solms-Hohensolms-Lich, Grand Duchess of Hesse and Rhine	1907	Portrait	
	Princess Victoria Louise of Prussia, Duchess of Brunswick	c. 1907	Portrait	
	Prince Sigismund of Prussia	1907	Portrait	
	Arthur Hamilton Lee	1907	Portrait	
	Lajos Ernst	1907	Portrait	
	Fürstin Dietrichstein zu Nikolsburg, née Princess Olga Dolgouruky	1907	Portrait	
	Portrait of a lady in a large hat	1907	Portrait	
	Rookesbury Park, Wickham, Hampshire	1907	Portrait	
	Augusta Victoria of Schleswig-Holstein, German Empress and Queen of Prussia	1908	Portrait	
	Cecilie, German Crown Princess	1908	Portrait	Marmorpalais
	Wilhelm II, German Emperor	1908	Portrait	
	Arthur Balfour, 1st Earl of Balfour	1908	Portrait	
	Arthur Balfour, 1st Earl of Balfour	1908	Portrait	National Portrait Gallery, London
	Francis Charteris, 10th Earl of Wemyss	1908	Portrait	National Galleries Scotland
	Grace Charteris, Countess of Wemyss	1908	Portrait	
	Ruth Moore (later Viscountess Lee of Fareham)	1908	Portrait	
	Arthur Lee (later 1st Viscount Lee of Fareham)	1908	Portrait	
	Arthur Lee (later 1st Viscount Lee of Fareham)	1908	Portrait	
	Julian Byng (later 1st Viscount Byng of Vimy)	1908	Portrait	
	Baroness Marga and Dorothée Schröder	1908	Portrait	
	Ella Louise Moore	1908	Portrait	Courtauld Gallery
	Prince Louis of Battenberg	1909	Portrait	
	Margot Asquith	1909	Portrait	Parliamentary Art Collection
	Gertrude Keppel, Countess of Albemarle, née Lady Gertrude Lucia Egerton	1909	Portrait	Private
	Countess Julia Branicka	1909	Portrait	
	Dame Helen Gwynne-Vaughan	1909	Portrait	Birkbeck, University of London
	Theodoor van Riemsdijk	1909	Portrait	Cultural Heritage Agency of the Netherlands Art Collection

=== 1910–1919 ===
Painting	Name/Subject	Year	Type	Current Location
	Prince Louis of Battenberg	1910	Portrait	Private collection of Prince Philip, Duke of Edinburgh
	Maria Christina of Austria, Queen of Spain	1910	Portrait	Royal Palace of Madrid
	King Alfonso XIII	1910	Portrait	Private
	King Alfonso XIII	1910	Portrait	Private
	Victoria Eugenie of Battenberg, Queen of Spain	1910	Portrait	
	Rudolph Lambart, 10th Earl of Cavan	1910	Portrait	
	Caroline Lambart, Countess of Cavan, née Caroline Inez Crawley	1910	Portrait	
	Caroline Lambart, Countess of Cavan, née Caroline Inez Crawley	1910	Portrait	
	Vita Sackville-West	1910	Portrait	
	Robert Bacon	1910	Portrait	
	Theodore Roosevelt	1910	Portrait	The White House
	Louis Antoine van Loon	1910	Portrait	
	Elizabeth Maude Guinness	1910	Portrait	
	The Three Graces	1910	Portrait	Welshpool Town Hall
	Wilhelm II, German Emperor	1911	Portrait	slashed in 1945 by a Russian soldier (before restoration)
	Harriet Loyd-Lindsay, Baroness Wantage	1911	Portrait	
	Harriet Loyd-Lindsay, Baroness Wantage	1911	Portrait	Private
	Winifred Cavendish-Bentinck, Duchess of Portland	1911	Sketch	
	William Palmer, 2nd Earl of Selborne	1911	Portrait	
	Frederick Roberts, 1st Earl Roberts	1911	Portrait	
	Frederick Roberts, 1st Earl Roberts	1911	Portrait	
	Frederick Roberts, 1st Earl Roberts	1911	Portrait	
	Countess Roberts, née Nora Henrietta Bews	1911	Portrait	
	Countess Fitzwilliam, née Lady Maud Frederica Elizabeth Dundas	1911	Portrait	
	Eloise Heathcote-Drummond-Willoughby, Countess of Ancaster	1911	Portrait	
	Ethel Beatty (later Countess Beatty)	1911	Portrait	
	Sir Walter Beaupré Townley	1911	Portrait	Government Art Collection, Embassy of the United Kingdom in Paris
	Madame Max Jaunez	1911	Portrait	
	Self-portrait	1911	Portrait	Hungarian National Gallery
	Princess Beatrice	1912	Portrait	
	Countess Dénes Széchényi (Note: Countess Dénes Széchényi (née Émilie de Riquet, comtesse de Caraman-Chimay).)	1912	Portrait	
	Winifred Cavendish-Bentinck, Duchess of Portland	1912	Portrait	
	Winifred Cavendish-Bentinck, Duchess of Portland	1912	Portrait	Portland College
	Winifred Cavendish-Bentinck, Duchess of Portland	1912	Portrait	
	Winifred Cavendish-Bentinck, Duchess of Portland	1912	Portrait	
	William Cavendish-Bentinck, 6th Duke of Portland	1912	Portrait	
	William Cavendish-Bentinck, 6th Duke of Portland	1912	Portrait	
	William Cavendish-Bentinck, 6th Duke of Portland	1912	Portrait	
	Violet Graham, Duchess of Montrose	1912	Portrait	
	Lady Mary Louise Hamilton, later Duchess of Montrose	1912	Portrait	Brodick Castle
	Victoria Eugenie of Battenberg, Queen of Spain	1912	Portrait	
	Theresa Vane-Tempest-Stewart, Marchioness of Londonderry	1912	Portrait	
	Gilbert Elliot-Murray-Kynynmound, 4th Earl of Minto	1912	Portrait	
	Mary Caroline Elliot-Murray-Kynynmound, Countess of Minto	1912	Portrait	
	Robin Vane-Tempest-Stewart, Lord Stewart (later 8th Marquess of Londonderry)	1912	Portrait	
	Peter Wentworth-Fitzwilliam, Viscount Milton (later 8th Earl Fitzwilliam)	1912	Portrait	
	Arthur Annesley, 11th Viscount Valentia	1912	Portrait	
	Ruth Moore (later Viscountess Lee of Fareham)	1912	Portrait	
	Ruth Moore (later Viscountess Lee of Fareham)	1912	Portrait	
	Francis Korbay	1912	Portrait	
	George Nathaniel Curzon	c. 1913	Portrait	
	George Nathaniel Curzon	1913	Portrait	
	Baron Alfons Mumm von Schwarzenstein	1913	Portrait	
	Countess Ferdinand Colloredo-Mannsfeld	1913	Portrait	
	Baron Gyula Forster de Pusztakér	1913	Portrait	
	Countess Anna de Noailles (Note: Countess Anna de Noailles (née Princess Anna Bibesco-Bassaraba de Brancovan).)	1913	Portrait	Musée d'Orsay
	Vicomtesse de Fontenay	1913	Portrait	
	Eileen Sutherland-Leveson-Gower, Duchess of Sutherland	1913	Portrait	Dunrobin Castle
	Edith Vane-Tempest-Stewart, Marchioness of Londonderry	1913	Portrait	
	Prince Andrew of Greece and Denmark	1913	Portrait	Private collection of Prince Philip, Duke of Edinburgh
	Anastasia de Torby	1913	Portrait	
	David Beatty (later 2nd Earl Beatty)	1913	Portrait	
	Sir Donald Tovey	1913	Portrait	
	E. C. Clark	1913	Portrait	
	Sir Charles Walston	1913	Portrait	
	Princess Cecilie of Greece and Denmark	1914	Portrait	Private
	Olga Constantinovna of Russia, Queen of Greece	1914	Portrait	Private
	Grand Duchess Elena Vladimirovna of Russia, Princess Nicholas of Greece and Denmark	1914	Portrait	
	Grand Duchess Elena Vladimirovna of Russia, Princess Nicholas of Greece and Denmark	1914	Portrait	
	King Constantine I of Greece	1914	Portrait	
	King Constantine I of Greece	1914	Portrait	
	King George II of Greece	1914	Portrait	
	Elinor Glyn	1914	Portrait	Museo del Prado
	Richard Crewe-Milnes, Earl of Madeley	1914	Portrait	
	Prince Louis of Battenberg	1914	Portrait	Imperial War Museum
	Rózsika Rothschild	1914	Portrait	
	William Cavendish-Bentinck, Marquess of Titchfield	1914	Portrait	
	Arthur Balfour, 1st Earl of Balfour	1914	Portrait	Trinity College, University of Cambridge (portrait damaged by pro-Palestinian protestors on 8 March 2024)
	Henry Howard, 19th Earl of Suffolk	1914	Portrait	
	William Ward, 2nd Earl of Dudley	1914	Portrait	
	Hudson Kearley, 1st Viscount Devonport	1914	Portrait	
	Charles Vane-Tempest-Stewart, Viscount Castlereagh (later 7th Marquess of Londonderry)	1914	Portrait	
	Sir Luke Fildes	1914	Portrait	National Portrait Gallery, London
	Johanna Laub (mother of the artist)	1914	Portrait	
	Sir Thomas Gardner Horridge	1914	Portrait	Manchester Art Gallery
	Princess Louise, Duchess of Argyll	1915	Portrait	Private
	Lucy de László	1915	Portrait	Private
	Princess Nina Georgievna of Russia	1915	Portrait	
	Princess Xenia Georgievna of Russia	1915	Portrait	
	Princess Anastasia of Greece and Denmark	1915	Portrait	
	Augusta Victoria of Hohenzollern, Queen of Portugal	1915	Portrait	Hohenzollern Collections and Court Library
	Augusta Victoria of Hohenzollern, Queen of Portugal	1915	Study	
	Ivy Gordon-Lennox	1915	Portrait	
	Ivy Gordon-Lennox	1915	Portrait	
	Ivy Gordon-Lennox	1915	Portrait	
	George Cholmondeley, Earl of Rocksavage (later 5th Marquess of Cholmondeley)	1915	Portrait	
	Viscountess Chaplin, née the Hon. Gwladys Wilson	1915	Portrait	
	Viscountess Devonport, née Selina Chester	1915	Portrait	
	Victor Elliot-Murray-Kynynmound, 5th Earl of Minto	1915	Portrait	
	Vere Ponsonby, Viscount Duncannon (later 9th Earl of Bessborough)	1915	Portrait	
	Priscilla Annesley, Countess Annesley, née Priscilla Cecilia Armitage Moore	1915	Portrait	
	Walter Keppel, Viscount Bury (later 9th Earl of Albemarle)	1915	Portrait	
	Violet Rawson, Lady Leconfield	1915	Portrait	
	Mrs. George Owen Sandys	1915	Portrait	
	The Hon. Cecil Richard Molyneux	1915	Portrait	
	Agatha Stewart Browne, Marchioness of Sligo, née Hodgson	1915	Portrait	
	Lucy de László	1916	Portrait	New Place Hotel, Southampton
	George Browne, 6th Marquess of Sligo	1916	Portrait	
	Sir Aylmer Hunter-Weston	1916	Portrait	
	Roundell Palmer, Viscount Wolmer (later 3rd Earl of Selborne)	1916	Portrait	
	Helen Percy, Duchess of Northumberland	1916	Portrait	
	Grace Curzon, Marchioness Curzon of Kedleston	1916	Portrait	
	Arnold Keppel, 8th Earl of Albemarle	1916	Portrait	
	Alexander Hugh Freeland Barbour	1916	Portrait	Royal College of Physicians of Edinburgh
	Rose Leveson-Gower, Countess Granville	1917	Portrait	Private Collection Granville
	Lady Rachel Cavendish (later Viscountess Stuart of Findhorn)	1917	Portrait	
	Evelyn Byng (later Viscountess Byng of Vimy)	1917	Portrait	
	William Ward, Viscount Ednam	1917	Portrait	
	The Son of the Artist	1917	Portrait	Private
	Sir William Pulteney	1917	Portrait	National Portrait Gallery, London
	Sir George Henschel	1917	Portrait	
	Oliver Baldwin (later 2nd Earl Baldwin of Bewdley)	1917	Portrait	
	Ulick de Burgh Browne, Earl of Altamont (later 7th Marquess of Sligo)	1917	Portrait	
	Oswald Sanderson	1917	Portrait	
	Beatrice Sanderson	1917	Portrait	
	Oliver Vickers	1917	Portrait	
	Self-portrait with family	1918	Portrait	
	The Marchioness of Londonderry	1918	Portrait	Mount Stewart
	Prince Christopher of Greece and Denmark	1919	Portrait	Collection of Prince Michael of Greece and Denmark
	Lilias Margaret Frances, Countess Bathurst	1919	Portrait	
	John Simon	1919	Portrait	
	Montagu Norman, 1st Baron Norman	1919	Portrait	Bank of England Museum
	Madame Lechat-Wittouck	1919	Portrait	
	Violet Constance Maitland Grimston, Countess of Verulam, and her son James Brabazon Grimston	1919	Portrait	

=== 1920–1929 ===
Painting	Name/Subject	Year	Type	Current Location
	Violet Constance Maitland Grimston, Countess of Verulam	1920	Portrait	
	Violet Constance Maitland Grimston, Countess of Verulam	1920	Portrait	
	Princess Xenia Georgievna of Russia	c. 1920	Portrait	
	Henry Petty-Fitzmaurice, 5th Marquess of Lansdowne	1920	Portrait	
	Lady Mount Temple	1920	Portrait	Private
	The Rt. Hon. Sir Austen Chamberlain	1920	Portrait	
	Victoria Eugenie of Battenberg, Queen of Spain	1920	Portrait	Private
	Lydia Édith Eustis (Note: Mrs. Lydia Eustis, lyrical artist and the wife of the Dutch diplomat John Loudon.)	1920	Portrait	
	Mrs. John W. Davis (née Ellen G. Bassel)	1920	Portrait	
	Mrs. Derek Oldham (née Winnie Melville)	1920	Portrait	
	Sir Richard Stuart Lake	1920	Portrait	
	Robert, 7th Duke d'Ursel	1920	Portrait	
	George Sutherland-Leveson-Gower, 5th Duke of Sutherland	1920	Portrait	
	Lord and Lady Lee of Fareham	1920	Portrait	
	Mrs Faith Moore	1920	Portrait	
	Lady Jane Muir Coats of Ballathie	1920	Portrait	Perth Art Gallery
	King Faisal I of Iraq	1920	Portrait	
	King Faisal I of Iraq	1921	Portrait	
	Florence Harding	1921	Portrait	The White House
	Princess Marie Bonaparte, Princess George of Greece and Denmark	1921	Portrait	
	William Palmer, 2nd Earl of Selborne	1921	Portrait	
	Hugh Molyneux (later 7th Earl of Sefton)	1921	Portrait	
	Hudson Kearley, 1st Viscount Devonport	1921	Portrait	
	Arthur Hamilton Lee, Lord Lee of Fareham	1921	Portrait	
	William Richards Castle Jr.	1921	Portrait	Private
	Bertha Phillpotts	1921	Portrait	
	Gladys Vanderbilt Széchenyi	1921	Portrait	
	Edmund Pearce	1921	Portrait	
	Francis Patrick Garvan	1921	Portrait	
	Charles Evans Hughes	1921	Portrait	
	Henrietta Jex-Blake	1921	Portrait	Lady Margaret Hall, Oxford
	Doña María Mercedes de Alvear	1921	Portrait	
	King Gustaf V of Sweden	1922	Portrait	Private
	Elisabeth of Bavaria, Queen of the Belgians	1922	Portrait	Private
	Elisabeth of Bavaria, Queen of the Belgians	1922	Portrait	Private
	Princess Olga of Greece and Denmark	1922	Portrait	Private
	Prince Christopher of Greece and Denmark	1922	Portrait	
	Princess Anastasia of Greece and Denmark	1922	Portrait	
	Princess Maria Ruspoli, Duchess of Gramont (Note: Donna Maria dei Principi Ruspoli (1888–1976), was the second wife of Agénor of Gramont, 11th Duke of Gramont. She was the granddaughter of Bartolomeo Ruspoli and Khevenhüller-Metsch)	1922	Portrait	
	Lilian Wellesley, Marchioness of Douro	1922	Portrait	
	Princess Alice of Battenberg	1922	Portrait	Private collection of Prince Philip, Duke of Edinburgh
	Princess Alice of Battenberg	1922	Portrait	
	Myron T. Herrick	1922	Portrait	
	Edward Libbey	1922	Portrait	
	James Stanhope, 7th Earl Stanhope	1923	Portrait	
	Countess Stanhope, née Lady Eileen Agatha Browne	1923	Portrait	
	Edwina Ashley (later Edwina Mountbatten, Countess Mountbatten of Burma)	1923	Portrait	Private
	Princess Victoria of Hesse and by Rhine (later Victoria Mountbatten, Marchioness of Milford Haven)	1923	Portrait	Private
	Maud Palmer, Countess of Selborne	1923	Portrait	
	Esmond Harmsworth (later 2nd Viscount Rothermere)	1923	Portrait	
	Mrs. Robert Livingston Fryer (née Melissa Dodge Pratt)	1923	Portrait	
	John Maffey, 1st Baron Rugby	1923	Portrait	National Portrait Gallery, London
	John Maffey, 1st Baron Rugby	1924	Portrait	
	Pope Pius XI	1924	Portrait	Bodleian Library
	Queen Marie of Romania	1924	Portrait	Peleș Castle
	Lady Frances Gresley (Note: Lady Frances Gresley was the wife of Sir Robert Gresley, 11th Baronet and the daughter of George Spencer-Churchill, 8th Duke of Marlborough.)	1924	Portrait	
	Lord Louis Mountbatten	1924	Portrait	Private
	Lady Louis Mountbatten	1924	Portrait	Private
	George Mountbatten, 2nd Marquess of Milford Haven	1924	Portrait	Private
	Seymour Bathurst, 7th Earl Bathurst	1924	Portrait	
	Sir Robert Gresley, 11th Baronet	1924	Portrait	
	Edith Dresselhuys (née Merandon du Plessis, later Lady Kemsley)	1924	Portrait	
	Charles Vane-Tempest-Stewart, 7th Marquess of Londonderry	1924	Portrait	
	William Lever, 1st Viscount Leverhulme	1924	Portrait	
	Sir Ernest Rutherford	1924	Portrait	
	Mrs. John Walter	1924	Portrait	
	Sir James Jeans	1924	Portrait	Royal Society
	Elisabeth of Romania, Queen of Greece	1924	Portrait	
	Self-portrait	1925	Portrait	private
	Elisabeth of Romania, Queen of Greece	1925	Portrait	
	Gwen Mullins	1925	Portrait	private
	Frank B. Kellogg	1925	Portrait	National Portrait Gallery, Washington, D.C.
	Helen of Greece and Denmark, Queen Mother of Romania	1925	Portrait	Private
	Lord Louis Mountbatten	1925	Portrait	Private
	Lady Alastair Graham	1925	Portrait	
	Elizabeth, Duchess of York (later Queen Elizabeth the Queen Mother)	1925	Portrait	Royal Collection
	Winifred Cavendish-Bentinck, Duchess of Portland	1925	Portrait	
	Ruby Baring, Countess of Cromer, née Lady Ruby Florence Mary Elliot	1925	Portrait	
	Ruby Baring, Countess of Cromer, née Lady Ruby Florence Mary Elliot	1925	Portrait	
	Hudson Kearley, 1st Viscount Devonport	1925	Portrait	
	Viscount and Viscountess Lee of Fareham	1925	Portrait	
	Clarice de Rothschild	1925	Portrait	
	Georg von und zu Franckenstein	1925	Portrait	
	Indira Devi, Maharani of Cooch Behar	1925	Portrait	
	Sir Arthur Shipley	1925	Portrait	Christ's College, Cambridge
	Alfred Cort Haddon	1925	Portrait	Haddon Library
	William Reddaway	1926	Portrait	Fitzwilliam College, Cambridge
	Princess Beatrice	1926	Portrait	Royal Collection
	Princess Beatrice	1926	Portrait	Private
	Victoria Eugenie of Battenberg, Queen of Spain	1926	Portrait	
	Sir Henry Birchenough, 1st Baronet	1926	Portrait	
	Ailsa Mellon Bruce	1926	Portrait	National Gallery of Art
	Andrew W. Mellon	1926	Portrait	United States Department of the Treasury
	President Calvin Coolidge	1926	Portrait	President Calvin Coolidge State Historical Site
	First Lady Grace Coolidge	1926	Portrait	University of Vermont
	Antonine de Mun, Dowager Duchess d'Ursel	1926	Portrait	
	Bruno Schröder	1926	Portrait	
	James Bertrand de Vinchelez Payen-Payne	1926	Portrait	Jersey Museum and Art Gallery
	Rufus Isaacs, 1st Marquess of Reading	1926	Portrait	Private
	Rufus Isaacs, 1st Marquess of Reading	1926	Portrait	Private
	Concepción Loizaga-Corcuera y Palomar	1926	Portrait	Private
	Rufus Isaacs, 1st Marquess of Reading	1927	Portrait	Private
	Edith Vane-Tempest-Stewart, Marchioness of Londonderry	1927	Portrait	
	King Alfonso XIII	1927	Portrait	Museo Nacional Centro de Arte Reina Sofía
	Victoria Eugenie of Battenberg, Queen of Spain	1927	Portrait	Museo del Prado
	Victoria Eugenie of Battenberg, Queen of Spain	1927	Portrait	Private
	Infante Gonzalo of Spain	1927	Portrait	Patrimonio Nacional
	Infante Juan, Count of Barcelona	1927	Portrait	Royal Palace of Madrid
	Alfonso, Prince of Asturias	1927	Portrait	Royal Palace of Madrid
	Alfonso, Prince of Asturias	1927	Portrait	
	Infante Jaime, Duke of Segovia	1927	Portrait	
	Infanta Beatriz of Spain	1927	Portrait	Patrimonio Nacional
	Infanta Beatriz of Spain	1927	Portrait	
	Infanta María Cristina of Spain	1927	Portrait	
	Miklós Horthy, Regent of the Kingdom of Hungary	1927	Portrait	Hungarian National Gallery
	Miklós Horthy, Regent of the Kingdom of Hungary	1927	Portrait	
	Alan Percy, 8th Duke of Northumberland	1927	Portrait	
	Dorothea Murray, Countess of Mansfield, née Dorothea Helena Carnegie	1927	Portrait	
	Rowland Baring, 2nd Earl of Cromer	1927	Portrait	
	Elinor Glyn	1927	Portrait	
	Indira Devi, Maharani of Cooch Behar	c. 1927	Portrait	
	Lady Margaret Myddelton (née Lady Margaret Elizabeth Mercer Nairne)	1927	Portrait	
	Baroness Philipp von Günzburg (née Marguerite Corisande de Gramont)	1928	Portrait	
	The Clock Room, Quai d'Orsay	1928		The White House
	Jenő Rákosi	1928	Portrait	Hungarian National Gallery
	Princess Margarita of Greece and Denmark	1928	Portrait	destroyed in a fire at Langenburg Castle, Germany in 1963.
	Philipp, Landgrave of Hesse	1928	Portrait	
	Richard Haldane, Viscount Haldane	1928	Portrait	National Portrait Gallery, London
	Princess Charlotte, Duchess of Valentinois	c. 1928	Portrait	Prince's Palace of Monaco
	Louis II, Prince of Monaco	1928	Portrait	Prince's Palace of Monaco
	Prince Umberto of Savoy, Prince of Piedmont	1928	Portrait	
	Princess Theodora of Greece and Denmark	1928	Portrait	Private
	Helen Percy, Duchess of Northumberland, and Lord Geoffrey William Percy	1928	Portrait	
	Richard Onslow, 5th Earl of Onslow	1928	Portrait	
	Lady Diana Evelyn Percy, later Duchess of Sutherland	1928	Portrait	
	Mrs. Paul Bridgeman and his daughter	1928	Portrait	
	Mrs. Edmund Buchanan	1928	Portrait	
	Countess of Onslow, née the Honourable Violet Marcia Catherine Warwick Bampfylde	1929	Portrait	Clandon Park House, destroyed during the mansion's conflagration in 2015.
	Lady Mary Elphinstone	1929	Portrait	Private
	Princess Alice, Countess of Athlone	c. 1929	Portrait	
	Madame Varnier, née Pauline Archer	1929	Portrait	National Gallery of Canada
	King Fuad I of Egypt	1929	Portrait	
	King Fuad I of Egypt	1929	Portrait	
	Farouk of Egypt	1929	Portrait	

=== 1930–1937 ===
Painting	Name/Subject	Year	Type	Current Location
	George Sutherland-Leveson-Gower, 5th Duke of Sutherland	1930	Portrait	
	Count Albert Apponyi	1930	Portrait	
	Harold Harmsworth, 1st Viscount Rothermere	1930	Portrait	
	William Palmer, 2nd Earl of Selborne	1931	Portrait	
	David Lloyd George, 1st Earl Lloyd-George of Dwyfor	1931	Portrait	
	David Lloyd George, 1st Earl Lloyd-George of Dwyfor	1931	Portrait	
	Mrs. Theodore P. Grosvenor (née Anita Strawbridge)	1931	Portrait	The Elms
	Princess Irene, Duchess of Aosta	1931	Portrait	
	Claude Bowes-Lyon, 14th Earl of Strathmore and Kinghorne	1931	Portrait	Private
	Cecilia Bowes-Lyon, Countess of Strathmore and Kinghorne	1931	Portrait	Private
	Elizabeth, Duchess of York (later Queen Elizabeth the Queen Mother)	1931	Portrait	Royal Collection
	Elizabeth, Duchess of York (later Queen Elizabeth the Queen Mother)	1931	Portrait	Private
	Prince Albert, Duke of York (later King George VI)	1931	Portrait	Royal Collection
	The Hon. David Bowes-Lyon	1931	Portrait	Private
	Helen Hughes (Note: Helen Beatrice Myfanwy Hughes was the daughter of Billy Hughes and Mary Hughes.)	1931	Portrait	
	The Hon. Mrs. Philip Leyland Kindersley (née Oonagh Guinness)	1931	Portrait	
	George Bell	1931	Portrait	
	Countess Sylvia Széchényi	1931	Portrait	Private
	Princess Alice, Countess of Athlone	1932	Portrait	
	Margaret Eustis Finley	1932	Portrait	Oatlands Historic House & Gardens
	Charles Grey, 5th Earl Grey	1932	Portrait	
	Cosmo Gordon Lang	1932	Portrait	
	Robert Cecil, 1st Viscount Cecil of Chelwood	1932	Portrait	
	Robert Cecil, 1st Viscount Cecil of Chelwood	1932	Portrait	
	Mrs. Virginia Heckscher McFadden	1932	Portrait	
	Elisabeth Severance Prentiss	1932	Portrait	
	Paul de László (son of the artist)	1932	Portrait	
	Princess Elizabeth of York (later Queen Elizabeth II)	1933	Portrait	Royal Collection
	Cosmo Gordon Lang	1933	Portrait	
	Julian Byng, 1st Viscount Byng of Vimy	1933	Portrait	
	Mabell Ogilvy, Countess of Airlie	1933	Portrait	McManus Gallery
	Peter Wentworth-Fitzwilliam, Viscount Milton	1933	Portrait	
	Viscountess Milton, née Olive Dorothea Plunket (later Countess Fitzwilliam)	1933	Portrait	
	Mrs. Claude Leigh and Miss Virginia Leigh	1933	Portrait	Private
	Mrs. F. W. Thring (née Olive Kreitmayer)	1933	Portrait	
	Esmond Harmsworth (later 2nd Viscount Rothermere)	1933	Portrait	
	Vere Harmsworth (later 3rd Viscount Rothermere)	1933	Portrait	
	Katherine Bigham, Lady Nairne (later Viscountess Mersey), née Lady Katherine Evelyn Constance Petty-Fitzmaurice	1933	Portrait	
	Doña Elizabeth G. de Hirsch	1933	Portrait	
	Don Alfredo Hirsch	1933	Portrait	
	Mary Ridgely Carter	1934	Portrait	The Preservation Society of Newport County
	King Albert I of Belgium (posthumous portrait)	1934	Portrait	Royal Collection of Belgium
	Irene Mountbatten, Marchioness of Carisbrooke	1934	Portrait	Private
	William Temple	1934	Portrait	
	Prince George, Duke of Kent	1934	Portrait	
	Princess Marina of Greece and Denmark	1934	Portrait	Private
	Princess Marina of Greece and Denmark	1934	Portrait	Private
	Princess Marina of Greece and Denmark	1934	Portrait	Private
	Prince Nicholas of Greece and Denmark	1934	Portrait	
	Sir Flinders Petrie	1934	Portrait	
	André Maurois	1934	Portrait	
	King George II of Greece	1935	Portrait	
	Prince George, Duke of Kent	1935	Portrait	Private
	Bridget Ogilvy, Countess of Airlie, née Lady Alexandra Marie Bridget Coke	1935	Portrait	
	Hélène Charlotte de Berquely-Richards	1935	Portrait	
	George Nuttall	1935	Portrait	
	Indira Devi, Maharani of Cooch Behar	1935	Portrait	
	Man Singh II, Maharajah of Jaipur	1935	Portrait	
	Queen Marie of Romania	1936	Portrait	National Museum of Art of Romania
	Queen Marie of Romania (Note: Before her marriage to King Ferdinand I of Romania, Queen Marie of Romania was Princess Marie of Edinburgh, a daughter of Alfred, Duke of Saxe-Coburg and Gotha and Grand Duchess Maria Alexandrovna of Russia.)	1936	Portrait	Private
	King Carol II of Romania	1936	Portrait	National Museum of Art of Romania
	King Ferdinand I of Romania	1936	Portrait	National Museum of Art of Romania
	King Michael I of Romania	1936	Portrait	Private
	Lucy Baldwin, Countess Baldwin of Bewdley	1936	Portrait	
	Henry Bathurst (later 8th Earl Bathurst) and George Bathurst	1936	Portrait	
	Prince Arthur, Duke of Connaught and Strathearn	1937	Portrait	Royal Society of Arts
	Cosmo Gordon Lang	1937	Portrait	
	Helen Percy, Dowager Duchess of Northumberland	1937	Portrait	
	William Morris, Lord Nuffield	1937	Portrait	
	William Morris, Lord Nuffield	1937	Portrait	Ashmolean Museum
	Bertrand Dawson, 1st Viscount Dawson of Penn	1937	Portrait	
	Cecile Rankin (Note: Cecile Rankin was married to John Grandy.)	1937	Portrait	
	Yasuhito, Prince Chichibu	1937	Portrait	destroyed
	Setsuko, Princess Chichibu	1937	Portrait	destroyed
	Lady White Todd (Note: Lady White Todd (née Miss Aline Lefebvre) was married to Sir Joseph White-Todd, 1st Baronet.)	N/A	Portrait	

== See also ==
- Philip de László
