= Samuel Ferguson =

Irish poet, barrister and antiquarian

Sir Samuel Ferguson
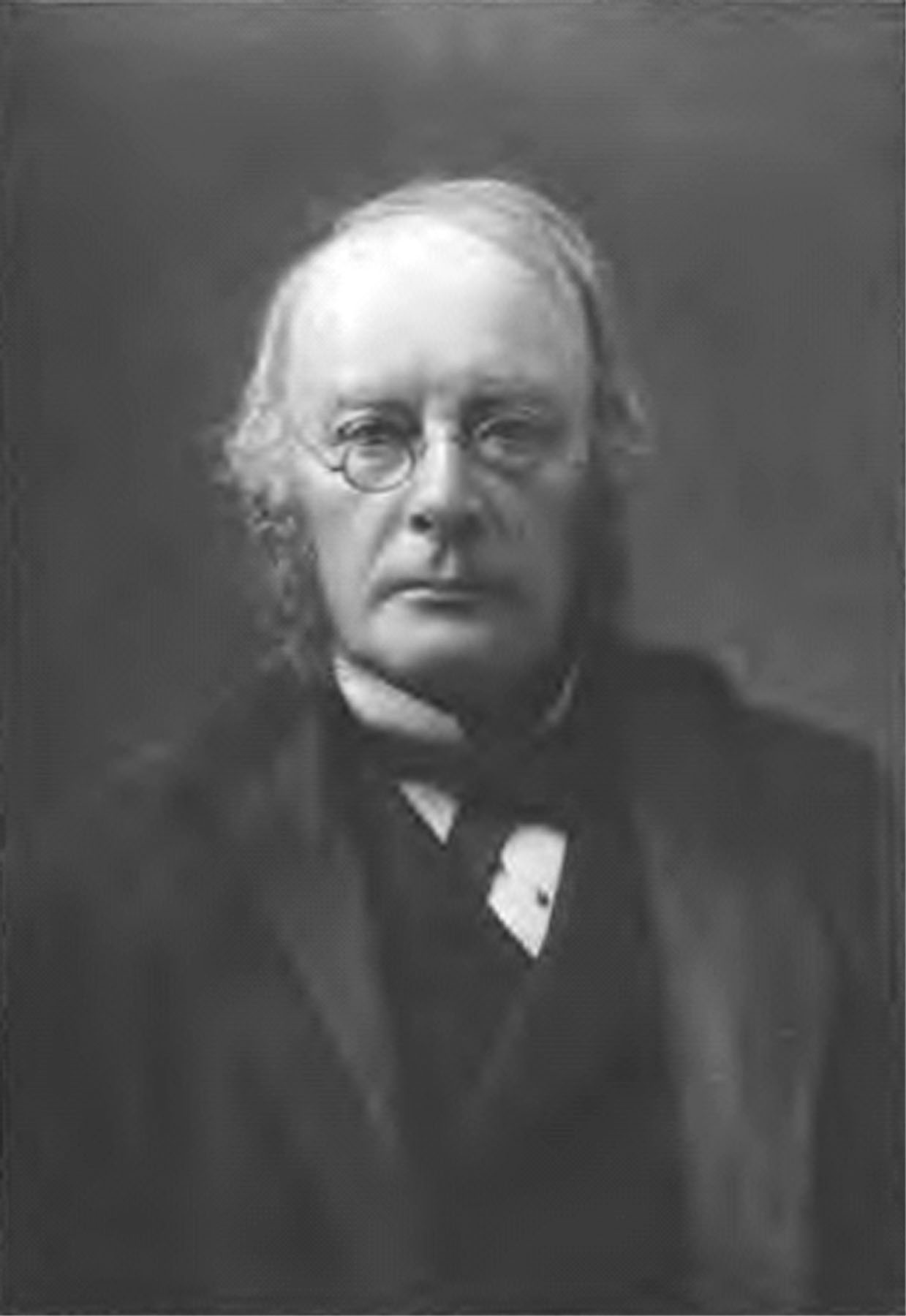
- Sir Samuel Ferguson
- Born: 10 March 1810; Belfast, Ireland
- Died: 9 August 1886 (aged 76); Howth, County Dublin, Ireland
- Occupations: Barrister, writer, Antiquarian
- Spouse: Mary Guinness
- Writing career
- Genre: Irish poetry
- Notable works: Congal, Lays of the Western Gaels

Signature
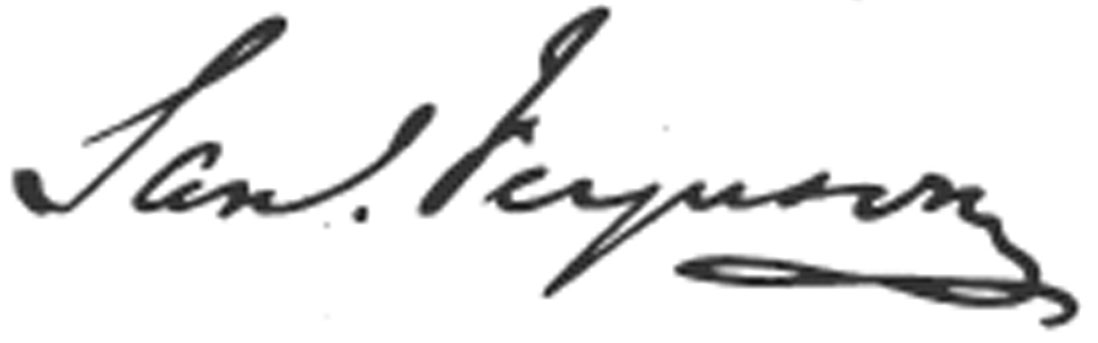

Sir Samuel Ferguson (10 March 1810 – 9 August 1886) was an Irish poet, barrister, antiquarian, artist and public servant. He was an acclaimed 19th-century Irish poet, and his interest in Irish mythology and early Irish history can be seen as a forerunner of William Butler Yeats and the other poets of the Irish Literary Revival.

== Early life ==
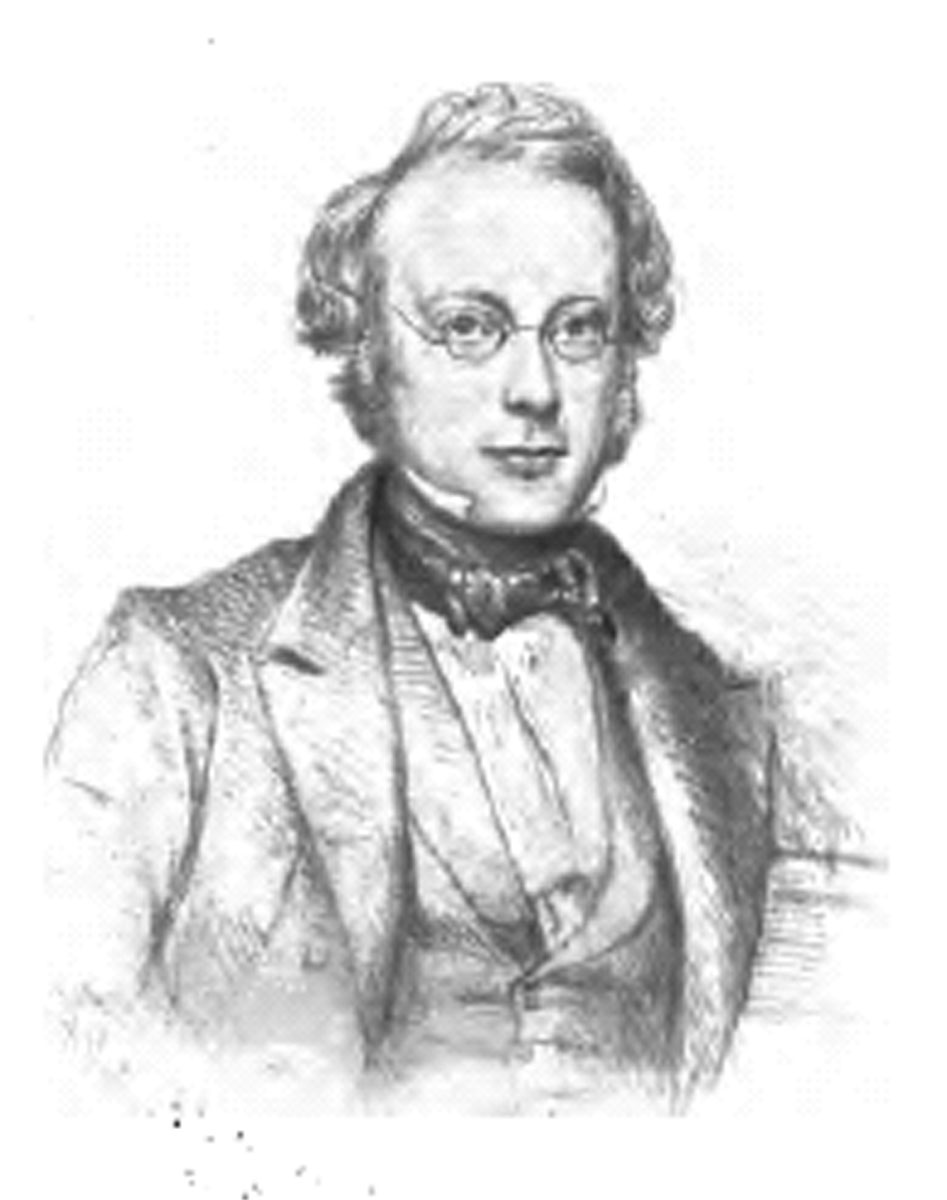
Samuel Ferguson in his youth.

Ferguson was born in Belfast, Ireland, the third son of John Ferguson and Agnes Knox. His father was a spendthrift and his mother was a conversationalist and lover of literature, who read out the works of Shakespeare, Walter Scott, Keats, Shelley and other English-language authors to her six children.

Ferguson lived at a number of addresses, including Glenwhirry, where he later said he acquired a love of nature that inspired his works. He studied at the Belfast Academy and the Belfast Academical Institution. Later, he moved to Dublin, for law education at Trinity College, obtaining his BA in 1826 and his MA in 1832.

His father had exhausted the family property and Ferguson was forced to support himself through his student years. He turned to writing and was a regular contributor to Blackwood's Magazine by the age of 22. He was called to the bar in 1838, but continued to write and publish, both in Blackwood's and in the newly established Dublin University Magazine.

== Later life ==
Ferguson settled in Dublin, where he practiced law. In 1846, he toured European museums, libraries and archaeological sites with strong connections to Irish scholarship.

He married Mary Guinness (1823–1905) in 1848, a great-great-niece of Arthur Guinness, and the eldest daughter of Robert Rundell Guinness who founded the Guinness Mahon bank. At that time he was defending the Young Irelander poet Richard Dalton Williams. He retired from the bar in 1867 when he was appointed First Deputy Keeper of Public Records of Ireland.

As well as his poetry, Ferguson contributed a number of articles on topics of Irish interest to antiquarian journals. In 1863, he traveled in Brittany, Ireland, Wales, England and Scotland to study megaliths and other archaeological sites. He made casts of nearly all the Ogham inscriptions in Ireland, England and Wales but relied on others for Oghams in Scotland. In 1884 he gave the Rhind Lecture on the subject 'Ogham inscriptions'. His preparation of the lectures for publication was completed after his death by John Kells Ingram, Joseph Anderson and Whitley Stokes and published in 1887 as Ogham Inscriptions in Ireland, Wales, and Scotland with a preface by his widow.

His collected poems, Lays of the Western Gael was published in November 1864, resulting in the award of a degree LL.D. honoris causa from Trinity. He wrote many of his poems with both Irish and English translations. He received a knighthood in 1878.

Ferguson's major work, the long poem Congal was published in 1872 and a third volume, Poems in 1880. In 1882, he was elected president of the Royal Irish Academy, an organisation dedicated to the advancement of science, literature and antiquarian studies. His house in North Great George's Street, Dublin, was open to everyone interested in art, literature or music.

He died in Howth, just outside Dublin city, and was buried in Donegore near Templepatrick, County Antrim.

== Works ==
- Lament for the Death of Thomas Davis, 1847
- Aideen's Grave, 1858
- Lays of the western Gael : and other poems, November 1864 (indicated as 1865)
- Cashel of Munster, 1867
- The Coolun, 1867
- Dear Dark Head, 1867
- Poems, 1880
- Congal, 1872
- Shakespearean Breviates, 1882
- Ogham inscriptions in Ireland, Wales, and Scotland, 1887
- The Poetry of Sir Samuel Ferguson, 1887
- Lays of the red branch, 1897
- Poems of Sir Samuel Ferguson, 1918
