= Lucy de László =

Irish socialite and musician (1870–1950)

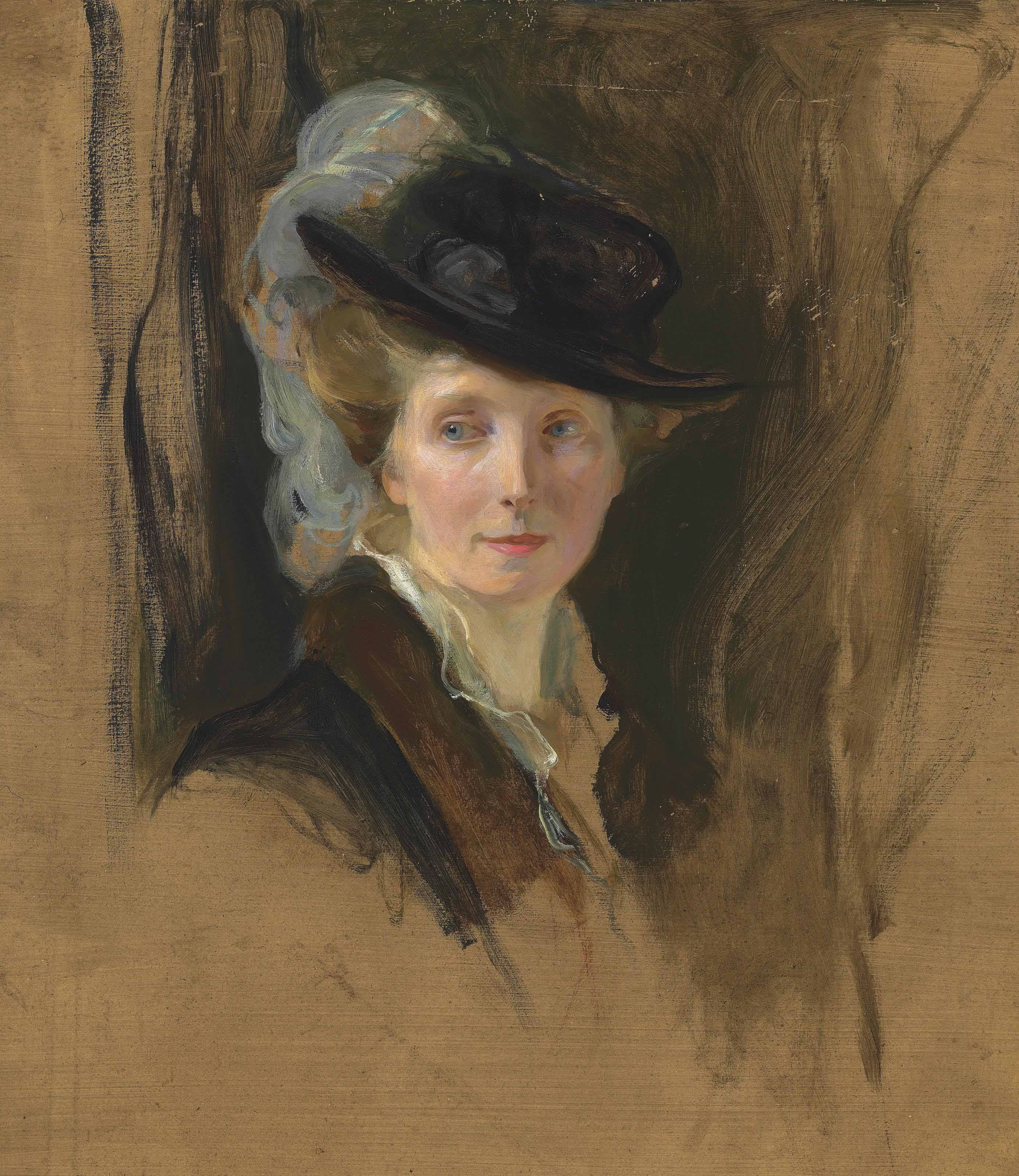
- Portrait by Philip de László, 1916
- Born: Lucy Madeleine Guinness; 22 December 1870; Stillorgan, County Dublin, Ireland, UK
- Died: 27 December 1950 (aged 80); London, England, UK
- Resting place: All Saints Churchyard, Tilford
- Other names: Lucy de László de Lombos; Lucy Guinness
- Occupations: Socialite, musician, diarist
- Spouse: Philip de László (m. 1900; died 1937)
- Children: 6
- Parents: Henry Guinness (father); Emelina Brown (mother)
- Relatives: Guinness family

Lucy Madeleine de László de Lombos (née Guinness; 22 December 1870 – 27 December 1950) was an Anglo-Irish socialite, amateur musician, and diarist. A member of the prominent Guinness family, she was the granddaughter of Robert Rundell Guinness, who founded the Guinness Mahon bank. She became part of the Hungarian nobility in 1912, when her husband, the painter Philip de László, was ennobled by Emperor Franz Joseph I of Austria. Guinness, who met de László in 1892 in Munich while studying music, was the subject of a series of his portraits.

== Early life and family ==
Guinness was born at Burton Hall, her family's country house in Stillorgan, County Dublin. Her father, Henry Guinness, Esq., was a justice of the peace who served as the Dublin manager of the Guinness Mahon bank, and her mother was Emelina Brown Guinness, daughter of James Brown, Esq. of Edinburgh. She was a sister of the politician and engineer Henry Seymour Guinness. A member of the aristocratic Guinness family, she was the granddaughter of banker Robert Rundell Guinness and a grandniece of the politician Richard Samuel Guinness.

== Adult life ==
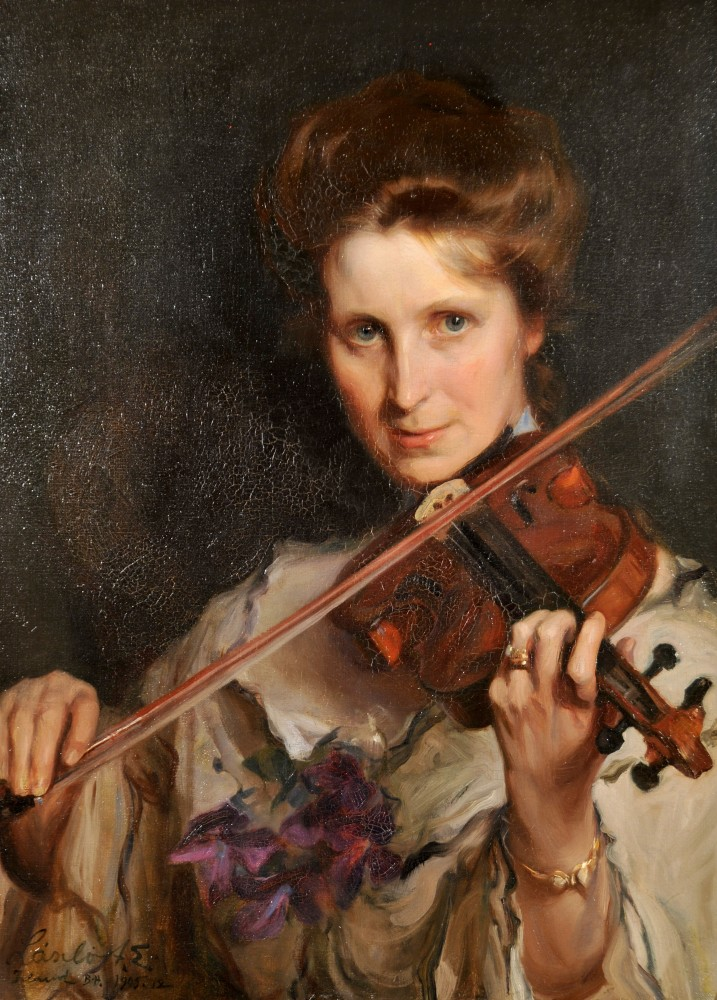
Lucy playing the violin, 1905

In the early 1890s, Guinness and her sister, Eustace, studied music in Munich. In 1892, while in Munich, she met the Anglo-Hungarian painter Philip László while he was studying at the Royal Bavarian Academy of Fine Arts. Her family disapproved of her courtship with a student artist of humble beginnings, despite his early success as a portraitist, and so the couple parted ways. László went on to paint portraits of the Bulgarian royal family, Franz Joseph I of Austria, and Pope Leo XIII, eventually gaining the approval of the Guinness family. Guinness was granted permission to marry him, and the two wed in 1900. Her husband, who was raised Jewish and converted to Catholicism, converted to Anglicanism in order to marry her. The couple had six children.

After they wed, the couple lived in Budapest and Vienna before settling in London in 1907. Guinness and her husband became part of the Hungarian nobility when László was ennobled by Emperor Franz Joseph I in 1912, taking the surname "de László de Lombos".

== Legacy ==
A 1902 de László portrait of Lucy, titled Lucy de László, hangs at her family's former estate Farmleigh. The portrait depicts her with a violin, referencing her musical capabilities. Her husband began sketches for the portrait while the two were on holiday in Rothéneuf. Her portrait is the first one de László painted since their honeymoon, and the first of his portraits to use landscape as a background. Her husband painted at least five known portraits where she was the subject. He is one of the first portrait artists to be recognised for the inclusion of the talents of his female subjects in the paintings of them.

Guinness' diaries were published in London in 2019 under the title The Diaries of Lucy de László, Volume I: 1890–1913.
