= Henry Guinness =

Irish engineer, banker and politician (1858–1945)

Senator
- In office 11 December 1922 – 12 December 1934

Sheriff of County Dublin
- In office 1899–1899
- Preceded by: Sir George Brooke
- Succeeded by: James William Cusack

Personal details
- Born: 24 November 1858 Stillorgan, County Dublin, Ireland
- Died: 4 April 1945 (aged 86) Tunbridge Wells, England
- Party: Independent
- Spouse: Mary Bainbridge (m. 1900)
- Children: 4, including Judy Guinness
- Education: Royal Indian Engineering College

Henry Seymour Guinness (24 November 1858 – 4 April 1945) was an Irish engineer, banker and politician.

== Early life ==
Guinness was born at Burton Hall, Stillorgan, County Dublin, the family home, on 24 November 1858. He was a son of Emelina (née Brown) Guinness and Henry Guinness (1829–1893), Esq. J.P., who had been the Dublin manager of the Guinness Mahon bank. His sister, Lucy Madeleine Guinness, married Philip de László, the Anglo-Hungarian painter known particularly for his portraits of royal and aristocratic personages.

His paternal grandfather was Robert Rundell Guinness, founder of the Guinness Mahon bank, and his maternal grandfather was James Brown, Esq. of Edinburgh.

He was educated at Winchester College and then the Royal Indian Engineering College.

== Career ==
Guinness worked as an engineer in the Indian Public Works in from 1880 to 1895. He served as a lieutenant in the Burma State Railway Volunteer Rifles in the Third Anglo-Burmese War. Back in Ireland he was a director of the Great Northern Railway from 1902 to 1924, director of the Bank of Ireland, and assistant managing director at Guinness from 1924 to 1930.

=== Public life ===
He was appointed Sheriff of County Dublin in 1899. A supporter of the Irish Unionist Alliance until 1921, he was chosen to represent the Irish business world as a Senator in the Senate of Southern Ireland, which failed to function.

During the Irish War of Independence Guinness arranged for the Sinn Féin led Dublin Corporation to be funded by the Bank of Ireland, as rates due from the Local Government Board had been withheld in 1920. W. T. Cosgrave chaired the British-run Local Government Board finance committee for Dublin, while being at the same time the Minister for Local Government of the Irish Republic. In 1951 he recalled that "I went to the Bank of Ireland and there interviewed two of the Directors, H.S. Guinness and Andrew Jameson. They eventually gave the accommodation so urgently required for the Corporation. It was for this reason that when President of the Executive Council at a later stage, I nominated these two gentlemen as Senators."

Guinness was nominated as an independent member of the first Irish Senate of the new Irish Free State for 12 years at the 1922 election. He supported measures such as a regular financial system and also the proposal by W. B. Yeats for the local translation of ancient Irish manuscripts. He did not seek re-election in 1934.

In 1953, he published The Guinness Family, written along with Brian Guinness, along with a number of essays and short books on the history of the Guinness family. The originals and supporting notes are at the National Library of Ireland.

== Personal life ==
In 1900, he was married to Mary Bainbridge (1871–1954), the second daughter of Robert Stagg Bainbridge, Esq. of Keverstone, County Durham. Together, Mary and Henry were the parents of four children, including:

- Moira Emelina Guinness (b. 1902), who married Capt. Arthur Lafone Frank Hills, OBE, in 1923.
- Rachel Ursula Isolde Guinness (b. 1906), who married Prince John Bryant Digby de Mahé, the only son of Prince Charles Digby Mahé de Chenal de la Bourdonnais, in 1931.
- Patricia Guinness (1909–2002), who married Frederick Charles Leopold Ullstein, a descendant of publisher Leopold Ullstein.
- Heather Seymour "Judy" Guinness (1910–1952), an Olympic medalist fencer who married twice.

He lived at Burton Hall, Stillorgan, for many years. In March 1923, during the Irish Civil War, the anti-Treaty republicans tried to burn it down, albeit without success.

== See also ==
- Families in the Oireachtas
