= William B. Leeds =

American businessman

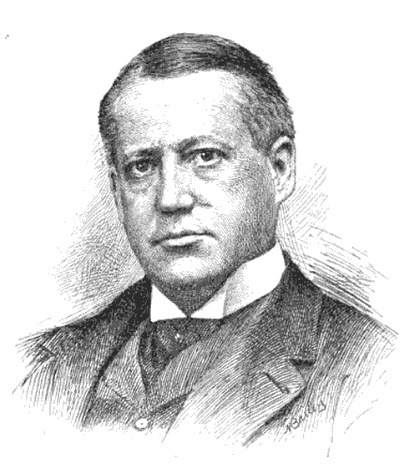
- Born: September 19, 1861; Richmond, Indiana, U.S.
- Died: June 23, 1908 (aged 46); Paris, France
- Known for: Tin Plate King
- Spouses: Jeanette Irene Gaar (m. 1883) Nonie May Stewart-Worthington (m. 1900)
- Children: 2

William Bateman Leeds (September 19, 1861 – June 23, 1908) was an American businessman. He dominated the tin plate industry, becoming known as the "Tin Plate King". Together with William Henry Moore, Daniel G. Reid and James Hobart Moore, he became known as one of the 'big four' or 'tin plate crowd' in American industry.

== Early life ==
Leeds was born in 1861, to parents Noah Smith Leeds and Hannah Star Leeds in Richmond, Indiana. After receiving an education at public schools, Leeds worked as a florist.

== Career ==
In 1883, Leeds joined an engineering corps. Three years later, Leeds was employed by the Cincinnati and Richmond Railroad, where he became division superintendent in 1890.

Leeds first went into the tin-plate industry with partners who invested about $250,000, and the company failed. Later, Leeds founded the American Tin Plate Co. in 1898, with his partners Daniel G. Reid, William H. Moore and James H. Moore. The company grew to consist of over 200 companies, and gained control of as much as 90% of the tinplate industry. The company expanded to comprise over 28 mills in Elwood.William McKinley passed a tin tariff, in part to protect their business. They organized the National Steel Corporation in 1899 to provide steel to the tin company, with about $50 million in stock. The company sold for as much as $40 million to U.S. Steel.

Leeds was also involved in founding the National Steel Corporation, American Sheet Steel Company and the American Steel Hoop Company He became president of Chicago, Rock Island and Pacific Railroad in 1902. In 1904, he was ousted from the company after a disagreement with his partners. Leeds was heavily involved with National Biscuit Company, Diamond Match Company, Tobacco Products Corporation and American Can Company. Additionally, he was the director of the Audit Co. of New York, Elwood, St. Louis and San Francisco Railroad, Burlington, Cedar Rapids and Northern Railway, Chicago and Eastern Illinois Railroad, United States Mortgage and Trust Co., Anderson and Lapelle Railroad Company, Nassau Gas, Heat and Power Co., Nassau Light and Power Co., and the Windsor Trust Co.

The Liberty ship SS William B. Leeds was named after him. Leeds was an avid yachtsman, and had membership in the New York, the Seawanhaka Corinthian, Brooklyn, Larchmont, and American Yacht Clubs. He maintained membership in the Meadow Brook club, Automobile Club of America, and The Brook club. The 'Billy Bi' soup of Maxim's was named after him. Leeds was also an avid horseman.

== Pearl necklace ==
Leeds purchased a pearl necklace for his wife. The necklace cost $360,000 when he bought it, but he only paid the ten percent tariff on pearls, rather than the sixty percent tariff on a pearl necklace. The United States filed suit, and for several years, as the case was litigated, the "Leeds pearls were the most famous jewels in America."

== Personal life ==
On August 16, 1883, Leeds married his first wife, Jeanette Irene Gaar, in Wayne, Indiana. She was a relative of Harry Miller, superintendent of Pennsylvania Railroad. On March 15, 1886, their only child, Rudolph Gaar Leeds (d. November 21, 1964), was born in Indiana. He was the publisher of The Richmond Palladium and The Indianapolis Sun, two major newspapers in Indiana.

On August 2, 1900, Leeds married his second wife, Nonie May Stewart-Worthington, whose first husband was George Ely Worthington (1872–1950), grandson of industrialist George Worthington. On September 19, 1902, their only child, William Bateman Leeds Jr., was born in New York City. Bates Jr. was the original "poor little rich boy", a name the press coined for him before it was applied to William Randolph Hearst.

On June 23, 1908, Leeds died in Paris, France. Leeds was 46. Leeds is buried in Richmond, Indiana.

After his death in 1920, his second wife, Nonie, married Prince Christopher of Greece and Denmark, an uncle of Prince Philip, Duke of Edinburgh. Nonie was created a princess in her own right and took the name “Anastasia” upon joining the Greek Orthodox Church, becoming known as “Princess Anastasia of Greece and Denmark”.

Nonie and Leeds's son, William Jr., would marry one of Prince Christopher's nieces, Princess Xenia Georgievna of Russia. The couple were married in Paris, and lived in Long Island. They had one daughter before divorcing in March 1930.

== See also ==
- Princess Anastasia of Greece and Denmark, title of Leeds' second wife after his death
