= Robert Rundell Guinness =

British banker

- Born: 12 December 1789; Dublin, Ireland, UK
- Died: 7 March 1857 (aged 67); London, England, UK
- Occupation: Banker

Robert Rundell Guinness (12 December 1789 – 7 March 1857) was an Anglo-Irish banker, most noted for co-founding the Guinness Mahon bank in 1836.

The grandson of Dublin goldbeater Samuel Guinness (1727–1795), he is the first of the "banking line" in the Guinness family.

== Family ==
Robert was the son of Richard Guinness (1755–1829), a Dublin barrister and judge, and his wife Mary Darley, descended from a well-known Dublin house-building family. He was a grand-nephew of the brewer Arthur Guinness, and the elder brother of Richard Samuel Guinness MP.

He married firstly, Mary Anne Seymour in November 1822, who died in 1837 at their home in Stillorgan, County Dublin. She was descended from an Irish branch of the family of the Duke of Somerset. They had three children:

- Mary Catherine (1823–1905), who married Sir Samuel Ferguson
- Richard Seymour (1826–1915), a banker with Guinness Mahon from 1841, and father of Benjamin Seymour Guinness
- Henry (1829–93), a banker with Guinness Mahon from 1851

He remarried to Mary Anne Moore in June 1840, and they had 7 children, including

- Revd Robert Guinness (1841-1918)
- 6 daughters who died childless.

His grandson Henry Guinness became an Irish senator in 1922. His granddaughter Lucy Guinness was the wife of the painter Philip de László.

== Guinness Mahon ==
Like his father, uncle and brother, Robert trained as a lawyer at the Kings Inns and was called to the bar in Dublin. Having run and dissolved a financial partnership with his brother Richard in 1836, he went into partnership in the same year with John Ross Mahon, principally as land agents, trading in Dublin as Guinness & Mahon; and from 1851 as Guinness Mahon & Company.

In 1854 the firm moved to premises on College Green in the centre of Dublin, increasing its banking business, and adding lines in insurance and assurance.

From his death in 1857 the banking side was further developed by his sons Richard Seymour and Henry, who went on to arrange advantageous discounting terms in 1873 with the Bank of Ireland.

== Other interests ==
Guinness was elected a life member of the Royal Dublin Society from 1821, joining its botany committee in 1823-26; its economy committee in 1831-38; and its statistics committee in 1840–41.
