= Guinness Peat Group =

Investment holding company

- Type: Public limited company
- Traded as: LSE: GPG
- Industry: Investments
- Founded: 1980s
- Founder: Guinness Mahon
- Defunct: 2015
- Successor: Coats
- Headquarters: London, England
- Operating income: £64 million (2014)
- Net income: £9 million (2014)
- Website: www.coats.com

Guinness Peat Group was an investment holding company with interests in Europe, Australia and New Zealand.

== History ==
The company, which had been formed as an investment offshoot of London based investment bank Guinness Mahon in the 1980s, was acquired by Brierley Investments in 1990. The company's shares were listed on the New Zealand Exchange (NZX) in 1991, on the London Stock Exchange (LSE) in 1992 and the Australian Securities Exchange (ASX) in 1993. In 2000, the company spearheaded a campaign to stop the London Stock Exchange from merging with Germany's Deutsche Börse.

Having disposed of its other investments, in March 2015 the company was renamed Coats Group after its remaining subsidiary. (Note: Coats Group remained listed on the LSE and became a constituent of the FTSE 250 Index, although it delisted from the ASX and NZX in June 2016.)
