= Princess Anastasia of Greece and Denmark =

American-born member of the Greek royal family (1878–1923)

Princess Anastasia
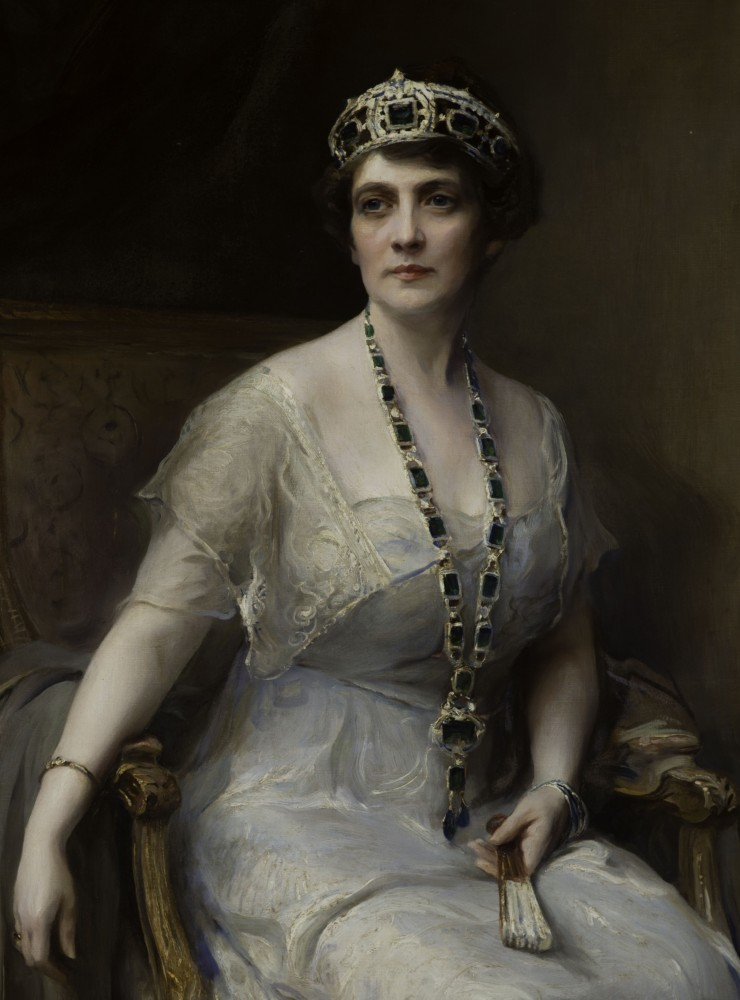
- Portrait by Philip de László, 1922
- Born: Nonnie May Stewart (Note: Her name was recorded as both Nonnie May and Nonie May (pronounced "NAH-nee may").); 20 January 1878; Zanesville, Ohio, U.S.
- Died: 29 August 1923 (aged 45); Spencer House, London, England
- Burial: Woodlawn Cemetery, Bronx, New York City, New York, U.S.
- Spouses: George Ely Worthington (m. 1894; div. 1898); William Bateman Leeds (m. 1900; died 1908); Prince Christopher of Greece and Denmark (m. 1920)
- Issue: William Bateman Leeds Jr.
- House: Glücksburg (by marriage)
- Father: William Charles Stewart
- Mother: Mary Lovinia Holden

Princess Anastasia of Greece and Denmark (born Nonnie May Stewart; 20 January 1878 – 29 August 1923) was an American-born heiress and member of the Greek royal family. She was married to Prince Christopher of Greece and Denmark, the youngest child of King George I of Greece and his consort, Grand Duchess Olga Constantinovna of Russia.

== Early life ==
She was born Nonnie May Stewart in Zanesville, Ohio, to William Charles Stewart, a wealthy merchant, and his wife Mary Lovinia Holden (sister of silver-mining magnate Liberty Emery Holden and aunt of millionaire philanthropist Albert F. Holden, eponymous benefactor of the Holden Arboretum), who had been married since 11 December 1874. By 1880, the Stewart family had moved to Cleveland, Ohio, where it appears that May's mother died not long afterward, and her father remarried. May was educated at home until the age of seventeen, when she was sent to Miss Porter's School for young ladies in Farmington, Connecticut. She was soon introduced to high society.

== First and second marriages ==
May married George Ely Worthington, son of Ralph Worthington (who was a son of George Worthington, a major Cleveland industrialist) on 1 October 1894. The marriage license inaccurately states that she was born in 1876, since Ohio law required that females be at least 18 years of age to marry. The couple lived as husband and wife for four years, having no children.

It is unclear how or where, but the marriage ended on 23 March 1899, by divorce or annulment. The 1900 U.S. census records that "May Worthington" was again living with her father and step-mother in Cleveland that year (George Ely Worthington had been born on 7 May 1872, in Cleveland and would die on 22 August 1950, in Temple City, California, leaving a widow and three children, having long outlived Princess Anastasia). Since the original marriage was contracted under false pretences and while May was legally underage, annulment is plausible.

On 3 August 1900, May married for the second time in Cleveland: the groom was William Bateman Leeds, a wealthy businessman who was born on 10 September 1861, in Richmond, Indiana. This was also Leeds's second marriage, the previous one having ended in 1896, at which time he settled one million dollars on his ex-wife. Nonie May and Leeds had one son, William Bateman Leeds, Jr., born on 19 September 1902. Leeds died in 1908 in Paris, France, leaving a fortune estimated at 35 million dollars and a reputation as America's "Tin King", based on his financial success in plating and marketing that metal.

== Third marriage ==
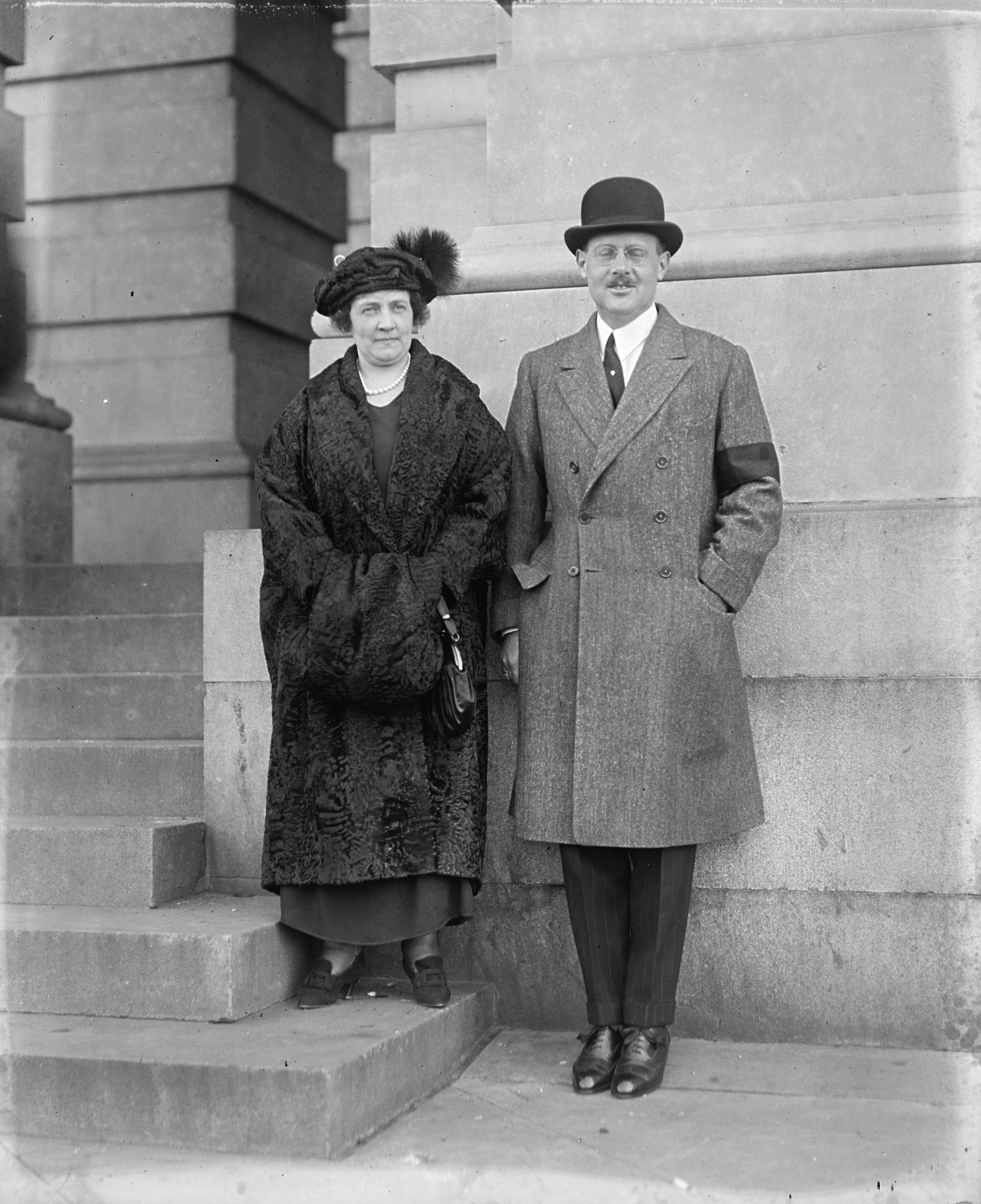
Princess Anastasia and Prince Christopher of Greece and Denmark, 1923

The wealthy, 30-year-old widow, soon to be known in Europe as Nancy May Leeds, chose to remain in Europe, where she socialized among the aristocracy. Leeds was a noted client of Cartier, having her own hall in this famous jewelry shop. She started collecting valuable art and furniture.

In a memoir, published shortly before his death, Prince Christopher of Greece and Denmark (1888–1940) addressed the persistent rumors alleging that his first wife was much older than he and that he married her for profit: The truth, he wrote, was that he met Mrs. Leeds, who was four years his senior, in Biarritz, France, in 1914 where they fell in love, eventually resolving to marry for no other reason. In reality, Leeds was ten years older than her husband. Their engagement was announced to the public in 1914 on the island of Capri. The wedding was delayed due to reservations within the Royal Family about the prince's proposed marriage to an American commoner who had been married twice already. After the First World War, when the dynasty went into exile and lived in much-reduced circumstances, family opposition to Prince Christopher's wealthy bride-to-be subsided.

The Eastern Orthodox wedding took place on 1 February 1920, in Vevey, Switzerland, six years after the engagement. Four days later, the bride joined the Greek Orthodox Church and took, as was usual, a new Christian name: Anastasia. Thereafter, she was officially styled as HRH Princess Anastasia of Greece and Denmark. However, the U.S. press continued to refer to her as the "Tin Plate Heiress", the "Dollar Princess" or the "Million Dollar Princess".

When Anastasia's 19-year-old son, William B. Leeds, Jr., married her third husband's 18-year-old niece, Princess Xenia Georgievna of Russia, in 1921, Anastasia is said to have objected because of the couple's youth. She denied rumors that her son would be given a title by the King and convert to the Orthodox faith prior to the marriage. The couple were married in Paris, lived on Long Island (where they had one daughter), and divorced in New York in March 1930.

Shortly after her marriage to Prince Christopher, Anastasia was diagnosed with cancer. She died three years later in 1923 aged 45 at Spencer House, London. According to her will, her remains were returned to the United States and she was buried with her parents in the family mausoleum at Woodlawn Cemetery in the Bronx, New York City.

On 11 February 1929, Prince Christopher married Princess Françoise of Orléans and fathered a son, Prince Michael of Greece and Denmark, who was born in January 1939. Prince Christopher died a year later.
