= Geoffrey Bell =

British economist (1939–2025)

Geoffrey L. Bell (8 November 1939 – 1 January 2025) was an English economist and banker. He founded the Washington-based Group of Thirty in 1982 and as late as 2005 the executive secretary. He created his own company the same year, Geoffrey Bell and Company which was voluntarily dissolved in 2012.

== Life and career ==
Bell was born in Grimsby on 8 November 1939. He was educated at the London School of Economics (LSE) before working at Her Majesty's Treasury and later returning to the LSE to lecture on monetary economics in 1964.

From 1966 to 1969, Bell was an economic advisor to the British Embassy in Washington, then joined Schroders bank, as assistant to the chairman, Gordon Richardson, later Governor of the Bank of England. He was chairman of the Guinness Mahon Holdings bank from 1987 to 1993.

In 1978 he founded the G30 advisory group after an invitation from representatives of the Rockefeller Foundation and remained the foundation's executive secretary.

In 1982 he formed his own consulting company, Geoffrey Bell and Company, which advises central banks and governments on financial management issues. His clients included the Central Bank of Venezuela for which he was financial adviser for over 25 years.

Bell died on 1 January 2025 at the age of 85.

== Author ==
- The Euro-Dollar Market and the International Financial System, MacMillan, 1973, ISBN 0-470-06405-6
