= Judy Guinness =

British fencer (1910–1952)

- winner of "fair play" in 1932

Personal information
- Full name: Judy Guinness Penn-Hughes
- Nickname: Judy
- Nationality: British
- Born: Heather Seymour Guinness; 14 August 1910 Dublin, Ireland
- Died: 24 October 1952 (aged 42) Matabeleland North, Rhodesia

Sport
- Country: United Kingdom
- Sport: Fencing
Medal record
Women's fencing
Representing United Kingdom
Olympic Games
| Silver medal – second place | 1932 Los Angeles | Foil, individual |

Heather Seymour "Judy" Guinness (14 August 1910 – 24 October 1952) was a British fencer. She won a silver medal in the women's individual foil event at the 1932 Summer Olympics. The judges had awarded her the gold medal but, in a noted gesture of fair play, she informed them they had failed to count two hits achieved by her Austrian opponent Ellen Preis.

She was a daughter of Henry Guinness (d.1945), an Irish engineer, banker and politician. In 1934 she married the racing driver Clifton Penn-Hughes. He died in a plane crash and she remarried John Henning in 1942. She died in 1952 at Springhare Farm in Rhodesia.
