= Mary Catherine Ferguson =

Irish writer, biographer, and archaeologist

Mary Catherine Guinness Ferguson (1823–1905) was an author and biographer in Dublin, Ireland.

== Life ==
She was born at Stillorgan, co. Dublin, on 13 September 1823, to Robert Rundell Guinness (1789-1857) and his first wife Mary Anne Seymour (died 1837). She was educated partly at home and partly at Woodside, Cheshire. Keenly interested from an early age in Irish art and archæology.

On 16 August 1848, she married the lawyer and antiquarian Samuel Ferguson, becoming Lady Ferguson when he was knighted in 1878. Their circle of acquaintances included George Petrie and William Reeves.

She died in Dublin on 5 March 1905, and was buried in her husband's grave at Donegore, co. Antrim. They had no children, but raised the children of her brother-in-law John Ferguson after their mother's death . Irish scholars, writers and artists often met at Ferguson's home.

== Works ==
Her own interest in Irish art and archaeology produced:

- The story of the Irish before the conquest. From the mythical period to the invasion under Strongbow (1868)
- Lays of the Red Branch (1897).

Her biographical works include:

- a biography of her husband in two volumes,
- Life of William Reeves, D.D., Lord Bishop of Down, Connor and Dromore, 1893, and she edited his papers after his death.

She is listed in the Dictionary of Irish Biography.
