= Princess Xenia Georgievna of Russia =

Russian princess (1903–1965)

Princess Xenia Georgievna
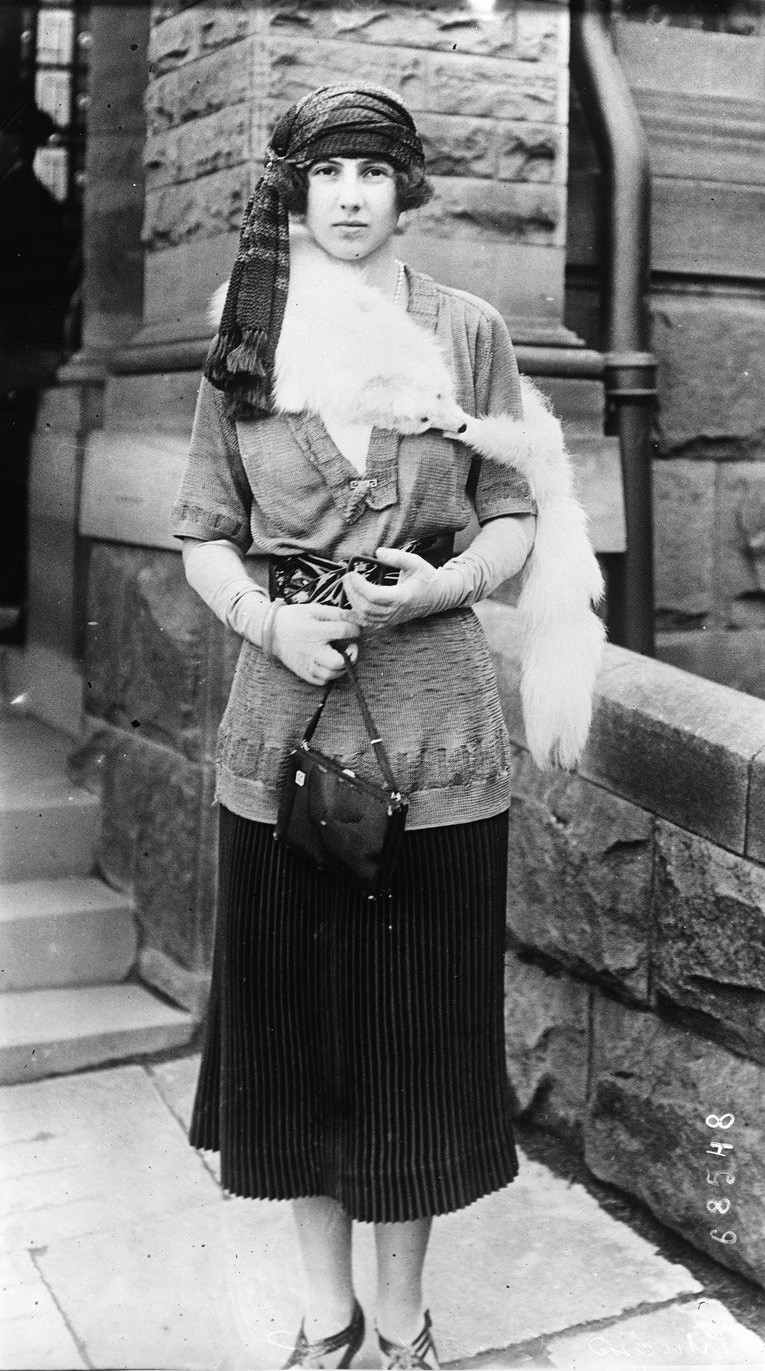
- Princess Xenia in 1921
- Born: 22 August 1903; Mikhailovich Palace, Saint Petersburg, Empire of Russia
- Died: 17 September 1965 (aged 62); Glen Cove, New York, U.S.
- Spouse: William Bateman Leeds Jr. (m. 1921; div. 1930) Herman Jud (m. 1946)
- Issue: Nancy Leeds Wynkoop (1925–2006)
- House: Holstein-Gottorp-Romanov
- Father: Grand Duke George Mikhailovich of Russia
- Mother: Princess Maria of Greece and Denmark

Princess Xenia Georgievna of Russia (22 August 1903 – 17 September 1965) was the younger daughter of Grand Duke George Mihailovich of Russia and Princess Maria Georgievna of Greece and Denmark. She is known for recognizing Anna Anderson as Grand Duchess Anastasia.

== Youth ==
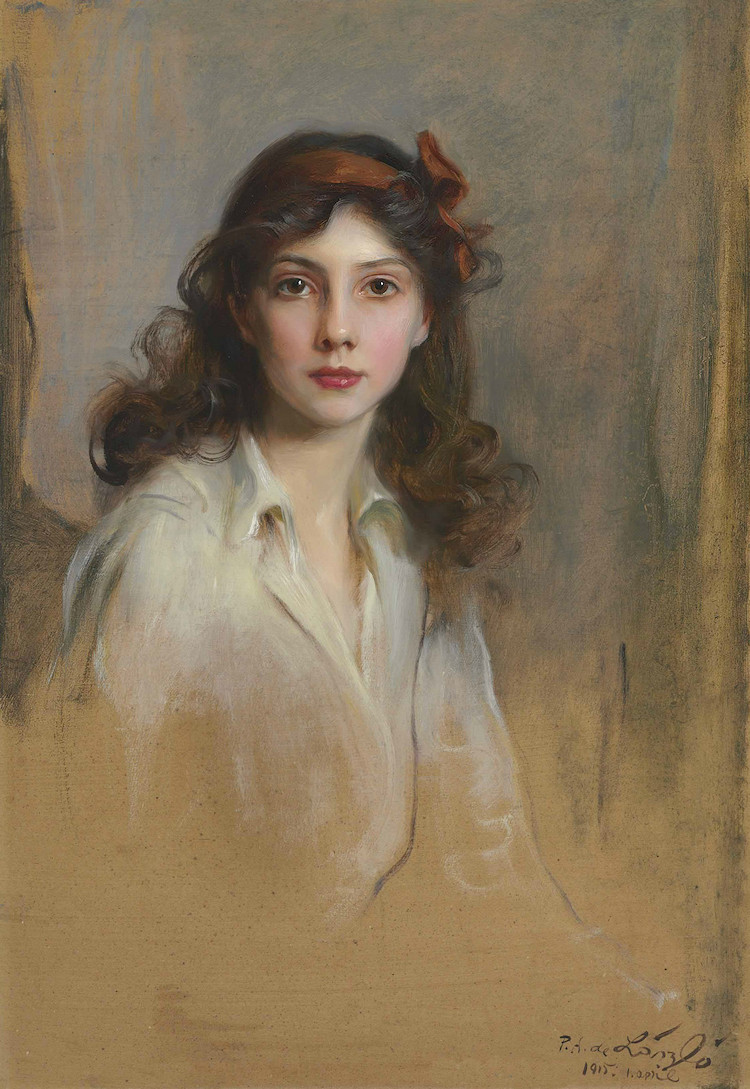
Portrait by Philip de László, 1915

Xenia and her older sister Princess Nina Georgievna, who was born in 1901, left Russia in 1914 to spend the war years in England with their mother. In 1919, her father, his brother Grand Duke Nicholas Mikhailovich, and their cousins Grand Duke Paul Alexandrovich and Grand Duke Dmitry Konstantinovich, were executed by a Bolshevik firing squad in St. Petersburg.

== Anna Anderson controversy ==
In the summer of 1927, Xenia involved herself in the Anna Anderson/Anastasia Tchaikovsky affair by telephoning Gleb Botkin (son of imperial physician Eugene Botkin, who had been murdered along with the former tsar and his family in 1918) with an invitation for Anna to live as a guest at their luxurious estate in New York's Oyster Bay. Xenia explains her hospitality: "I had heard that Botkin was arranging to bring 'the invalid' to the United States through a newspaper organization. This bothered me because I had heard so many conflicting stories. It then occurred to me that I should take her myself and avoid all this proposed publicity. For if she were indeed an impostor it would save much unpleasantness for my family, and if she were the real Anastasia it was ghastly to think that nothing was being done for her.... This solution would be simple, so it seemed to me."

As children, Xenia and her sister Nina had played frequently with the two youngest daughters of Tsar Nicholas II, Grand Duchesses Maria Nikolaevna and Anastasia Nikolaevna, as well as the youngest child and only boy, Tsarevitch Alexei. Through her father, Xenia was Anastasia's second cousin, once removed and through her mother they were second cousins. Both sisters possessed vivid memories of Anastasia, whom they described as "frightfully temperamental" and "wild and rough". According to Xenia, Anastasia "cheated at games, kicked, scratched, pulled hair, and generally knew how to make herself obnoxious."

Xenia was on a cruise with her husband William in the West Indies at the time of Anna's arrival in New York. She had arranged for Anna to stay with Annie Burr Jennings, a friend of Xenia's who lived in a Park Avenue townhouse. Upon her return, Xenia sneaked unannounced into Annie Jennings's crowded salon to observe Anna. After watching Anna offer her hand to Gleb Botkin, Xenia declared that she knew she was watching an equal. She stated, "It was so matter-of-course, so unforced—in no way a theatrical gesture. With it she radiated a natural grandeur and I was impressed on the spot."

Xenia recognized Anna Anderson as the Grand Duchess Anastasia at once, asserting that Anna was herself at all times, never giving the slightest impression of playing a part. The two remained great friends for life even after Anna Anderson had to leave Xenia's home after quarreling. Prince Christopher of Greece described the stay:

She stayed with my niece, ... who showed her the greatest kindness. Then her treatment of the Grand Duchess Xenia, sister of the last Tsar, led to a quarrel with William Leeds, who turned her out of the house.

Pierre Gilliard, tutor for the five children of Tsar Nicholas II from 1905 to 1918, pointed out that Princess Xenia had last seen her second cousin when Xenia was 10 and Anastasia was 12. Xenia responded that she did not recognize Anastasia visually, but felt she was qualified to tell the difference between a member of the Romanov family and a "Polish peasant woman." Anderson bore a strong family resemblance to Tsarina Alexandra's family and her moodiness and temper also reminded Xenia of her cousin Anastasia. Prince Dmitri, son of Grand Duchess Xenia, wrote about what Princess Xenia had stated,

Xenia's irresponsible statement should be somehow refuted ... We know she left Russia in 1914 aged 10 years old, I also know that Nina (her sister) and Xenia never saw Uncle Nicky's family very often, and when they did see them that was when they were very young.

== Personal life ==
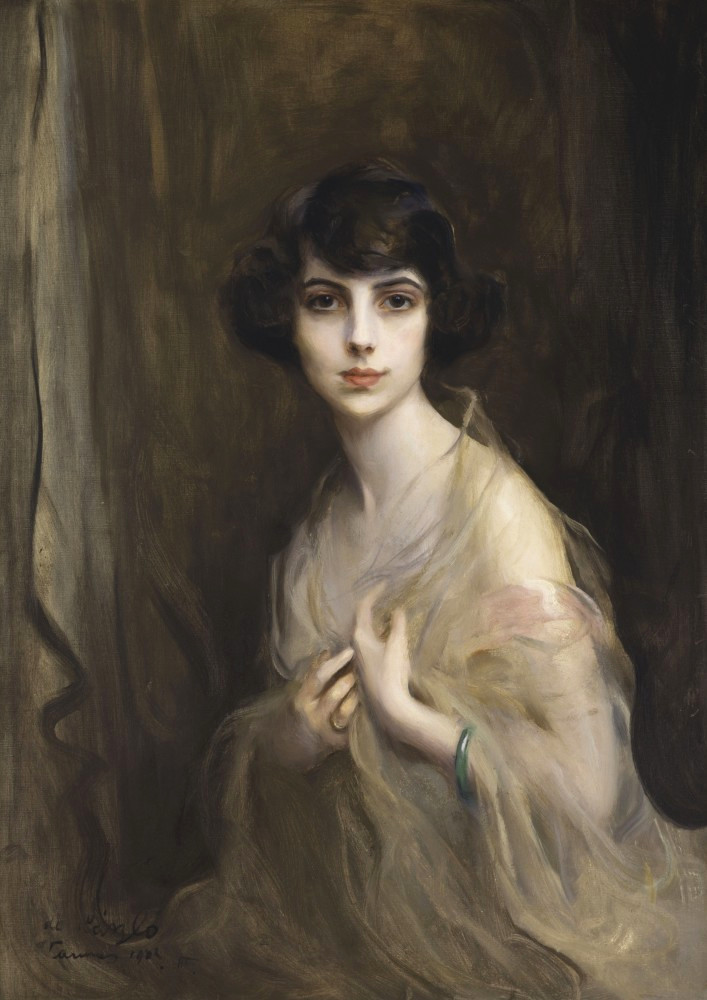
Portrait by Philip de László, c. 1920

Xenia married twice. At age 18 she married William Bateman Leeds Jr. (19 September 1902 – 31 December 1971), the son and heir of the American tin magnate William B. Leeds Sr. and the stepson of Xenia's maternal uncle Prince Christopher of Greece and Denmark, through his marriage to William’s mother, the former Nonie Stewart Leeds. They wed in Paris on 9 October 1921. Theirs was seen as a splendid match and the couple was an influential one in New York's Long Island North Shore society, where they lived at Kenwood, their estate in Oyster Bay. Xenia and William had a daughter on 25 February 1925, Nancy Helen Marie Leeds. Xenia and William Leeds divorced in 1930. Xenia's second marriage was with Herman Jud (1911–1987), whom she married at Glen Cove, New York, on 10 August 1946.

== Death ==
Princess Xenia Georgievna died on 17 September 1965, aged 62, survived by her second husband and by her daughter, Nancy Leeds Wynkoop, and by granddaughter Alexandra. Nancy Helen Marie Leeds Wynkoop died in Woodstock, Vermont on 7 June 2006, aged 81, survived by her husband Edward Judson Wynkoop Jr. and their daughter Alexandra Wynkoop.

== Honours ==
- (Russian Empire) House of Romanov: Dame of the Imperial Order of Saint Catherine

== Ancestry ==
Ancestors of Princess Xenia Georgievna of Russia

8. Nicholas I of Russia
4. Grand Duke Michael Nicolaevich of Russia
9. Charlotte of Prussia
2. Grand Duke George Mikhailovich of Russia
10. Leopold, Grand Duke of Baden
5. Princess Cecilie of Baden
11. Sophie of Sweden
1. Princess Xenia Georgievna of Russia
12. Christian IX of Denmark
6. George I of Greece
13. Louise of Hesse-Kassel
3. Princess Maria of Greece and Denmark
14. Grand Duke Constantine Nikolaevich of Russia
7. Olga Constantinovna of Russia
15. Princess Alexandra of Saxe-Altenburg

== Sources ==
- "Anastasia" by Peter Kurth
- https://web.archive.org/web/20091028121426/http://www.geocities.com/henrivanoene/genrussia4.html
- "Paid Notice: Deaths WYNKOOP, NANCY". The New York Times. 15 June 2006.
- http://freepages.genealogy.rootsweb.com/~wynkoop/webdocs/9181945.htm
