= George Worthington (businessman) =

Steel plate engraving of George Worthington c. 1860.

George Worthington (September 21, 1813 – November 9, 1871) was a 19th-century merchant and banker in Cleveland, Ohio, who founded the Geo. Worthington Company, a wholesale hardware and industrial distribution firm, in 1829 (until 1991 Cleveland's oldest extant business), as well as numerous banking and mining concerns, and contributed to the early commercial and industrial development of Cleveland.

== Early life and family ==
George Worthington was born in Cooperstown, New York, to Clarissa (née Clarke) and Ralph Worthington, a banker and manufacturer, who had moved to Cooperstown from his birthplace of Colchester, Connecticut, at a young age. Worthington was also second cousins with the American engineer Henry Rossiter Worthington of New York.

On November 16, 1840, Worthington married Maria Cushman Blackmar, and soon after, moved into his newly constructed home on Euclid Avenue, the street which would, in the second half of the 19th century, come to be known as Millionaire's Row. Maria C. Worthington had eight children; five girls and three boys, one of each dying in infancy, leaving his two sons, Ralph and his younger brother, George Jr., to inherit their father's business interests upon his death in 1871.

== Business ==
George's first store occupied the ground on which now stands the Bethel Building. Afterwards, he purchased the stock of Cleveland, Sterling & Co., on the corner of Water and Superior streets, where the National Bank buildings now stand, and associated with himself as business partner of Mr. William Bingham. In 1841, Mr. Bingham sold out his interest.

A few years later, Mr. Worthington associated himself with his cousin Mr. James Barnett and Mr. Edward Bingham. In around 1862, Mr. Worthington projected the Cleveland Iron and Nail Works in connection with Mr. William Bingham. Shortly afterwards, they built works for the manufacturing of a gas pipe.

On the passage of the National Bank Law, Mr. Worthington, with other capitalists, organized the First National Bank of Cleveland. The bank was incorporated in 1863, and at the first meeting of the stockholders, held in June of that year, he was chosen as one of the directors and elected president of the bank.

In 1865, Worthington was among the Cleveland businessmen who organized the Hahnemann Life Insurance Company (named for German physician Samuel Hahnemann), the first such firm in the U.S. to offer to insure those whose medical belief and practice were exclusively homeopathic, at lower rates than those subjecting themselves to traditional medical treatment; as some contemporary evidence showed a lower rate of mortality under the former. Worthington was also a director of the Ohio Savings and Loan Bank, for some years a director of the Cleveland, Columbus, Cincinnati & Indianapolis Railway Company, and was president of the Cleveland Iron Mining Company. He was also one of the pioneers in the development of the iron interests of Cleveland.

== Architecture and development ==
The George Worthington Co. constantly required relocation to larger facilities. In 1882, the hardware-wholesale-turned industrial supply company moved into its last building on 820 St. Clair Avenue. Designed by the Cleveland architectural firm of Cuddell and Richardson, The George Worthington Building is noted as a "highly decorative brick structure, notable for its unusually wide window bays grouped in two multi-story arched ranks, a brick cornice, recessed spandrels and finials." Having fallen into disrepair in the later half of the 20th century, the George Worthington Building was rehabilitated as modern loft apartments in 1996 on what is today Worthington Square, and is listed on the National Register of Historic Places as well as being a Cleveland landmark.

Worthington also did much in the way of building up the city, especially in the business portions, and owned at one point 14 buildings in what is today the Historic Warehouse District.

George Worthington is interred in the Worthington Mausoleum at the Lakeview Cemetery in Cleveland.
