= Guinness Mahon =

Irish merchant bank

- Industry: Investment bank
- Founded: 1836
- Defunct: 1998
- Fate: Acquired
- Successor: Investec
- Headquarters: London, UK; 16–17 College Green, Dublin, Ireland
- Key people: Geoffrey Bell (Chairman)

Guinness Mahon was an Irish merchant bank originally based in Dublin but more recently with operations in London.

== History ==
=== Formation ===
The firm was founded as a land agency in Dublin in 1836 by barrister Robert Rundell Guinness, a great-nephew of the brewer Arthur Guinness, and John Ross Mahon, an estate agent.

=== London business ===
A London office opened in 1873, closed in 1916 during World War I and then re-opened again in 1923. The London business became Guinness Mahon Holdings, which merged with Lewis & Peat Ltd in 1974, forming Guinness Peat.

The firm decided to enter the securities market buying White & Cheeseman, a stock jobber, in April 1984.

The Group ran into difficulties in the late 1980s and demerged into three parts: the Guinness Mahon investment banking business, Fenchurch Insurance and the off-shore investment activities. The offshore investment activities in Australia and New Zealand (then known as Guinness Peat Group) were bought by Brierley Investments Limited (a business controlled by Sir Ron Brierley) in 1990 and the Guinness Mahon investment banking business was acquired by Bank of Yokohama in 1991 and then sold on to Investec in 1998.

Meanwhile, Fenchurch Insurance merged with Lowndes Lambert in 1997 to create Lambert Fenchurch, then with Heath Group in 1999 to form Heath Lambert and then with Arthur J. Gallagher & Co. in 2011 to form Gallagher Heath.

=== Irish business ===
Guinness & Mahon (Ireland) Ltd was incorporated in 1942 and remained until August 1994 a wholly owned subsidiary of Guinness Mahon & Co., London. In 1969 Des Traynor was appointed to the position of co-managing director of the bank, a position he would retain until 1986. In 1970, he setup a subsidy bank in the Cayman Islands called Guinness Mahon Cayman Trust which would be center of the "Ansbacher Affair".

The bank's Irish private banking operation was acquired by Irish Permanent on 31 August 1994, and operated from a single location. The operations acquired were scaled down in 2000. There were also companies associated with Guinness & Mahon (Ireland) Limited and Guinness, Mahon & Co., London, who placed deposits with Guinness & Mahon (Ireland) Limited. These companies were - Guinness, Mahon (Guernsey) Limited, College Trustees Limited, Guinness, Mahon Jersey Trust Limited, Overseas Nominees Limited and subsidiaries of Credit Suisse.

== Operations ==
Its subsidiaries and offshoots included Guinness Peat Aviation and Guinness Peat Group in Australia and New Zealand and Guinness Flight Hambro, which became Investec Guinness Flight.

== See also ==
- List of banks in the Republic of Ireland
