= Norah Aiton =

British architect

Norah Aiton in her twenties

Norah Aiton (1903–1988) was a British architect who was an early proponent of the modernist style. Around 1930 she and her partner Betty Scott set up the architectural practice of Aiton & Scott. Their best-known work is the office building for the Aiton & Company pipe manufacturing company in Derby. This was remarkable both as a striking early example of modernist industrial architecture and also as a building designed by two of the small number of women working in architecture at that time.

== Family and education ==
She was born in London on 13 June 1903, the daughter of Adriana Wilhelmina née Stoop, a Dutch citizen before her marriage, and John Arthur Aiton, later Sir Arthur Aiton, an engineer who founded a steel pipe manufacturing company and became a prominent citizen in Derby where he established his business. Born in London in 1903, on 13 June according to one source, Aiton moved to Derby as a young girl with her two siblings and parents. She went to Girton College and passed Part I of the Cambridge Mathematical Tripos in 1923 but did not complete the course after winning a Royal Institute of British Architects (RIBA) scholarship to study at the relatively new Cambridge School of Architecture from 1924 to 1926. She went on to the Architectural Association School (AA), studied there until 1929 and got a RIBA diploma. There she met Betty Scott, her future business partner. The AA curriculum did not yet include modernism but Aiton was aware of continental modernist design, having made several trips to the Netherlands, including a summer working in the office of P. J. H. Kuypers. In 1933 she married Nicolaas Tollenaar, an insurance broker with Sedgwick, Collins & Co, a Dutchman who became a British citizen in 1934. She continued to be known as Norah Aiton professionally, but also used the name Norah Tollenaar.

== Career ==
Aiton told a newspaper interviewer of her enthusiasm for "ultra modern designs in steel and glass". and she admired the Dutch design school called De Stijl, partly inspired by the art of Piet Mondrian. After designing a house for Scott's parents at Stoke Poges, the partnership were given the chance to create offices for Aiton's father's manufacturing site in Derby. Unlike the more eclectic Scott, Aiton was a whole-hearted enthusiast for pioneering modernism.

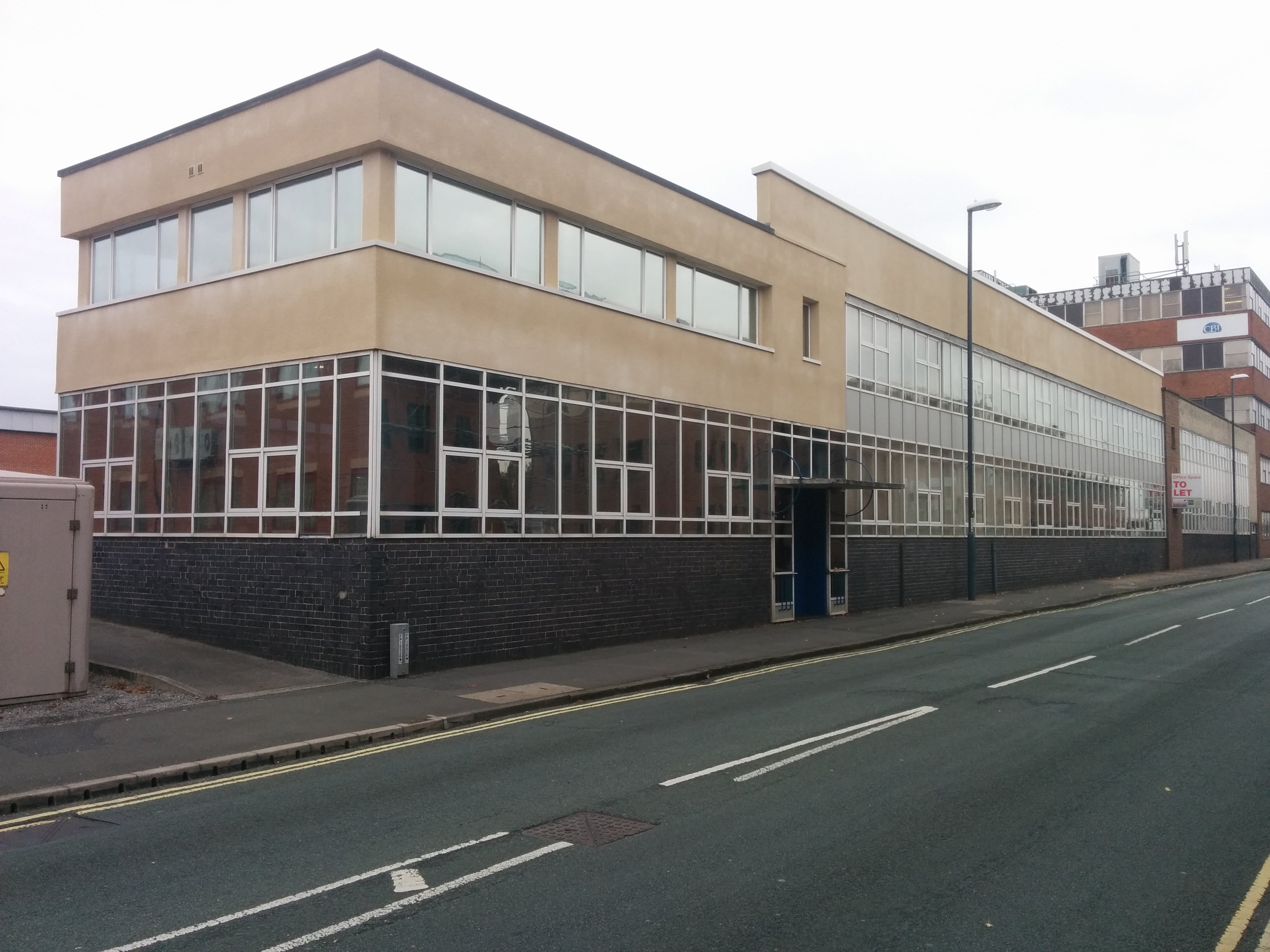
Aiton and Co is now closed but the building in Derby is Grade II listed

Aiton's father gave the architects free rein to come up with a cutting-edge innovative design which would reflect and promote the advanced technology behind the factory's products which included pipework for warships and power stations. This was especially apparent in the use of metal tubing echoing Aiton & Co.'s high spec pipes: used in the internal balustrades and elsewhere. The dominant steel and glass were used with colour in a "De Stijl" scheme combining red floors and jade green interior walls with blue brick, grey window frames and stucco, and white cement.

Historic England call this "a very fine and also extremely early example of the Modern or International style of architecture" and "one of the earliest industrial buildings to be designed by a partnership of women architects". The Architects Journal described it as an "early exemplary piece of high tech design". It is a Grade II listed building.

Aiton & Scott were based in London with premises in Sloane Street. Their other projects included a printing works, a private zoo at Chislehurst with monkey cages and fish tanks, a church, crematorium and various private houses. Their work was featured in the press, books, trade journals, a RIBA exhibition and beyond, and yet they have not been included in mainstream histories of modernist design. Architectural historian Lynne Walker and others suggest this is because the history of modernist architecture in the UK has been written from a masculine perspective. In her twenties and thirties Aiton was called a "girl architect" in the press and was asked whether women were best suited to designing domestic buildings. She was said to be working "in a new sphere of women's activities". In 1935, when the AA held an exhibition of women's architectural designs, there were said to be about 40 women architects in London.

== Later life ==
Although Aiton's career did not continue after the onset of the Second World War, her interest in art and design did. She was a member of the Contemporary Art Society and owned a collection of decorative art. She had lifetime possession of Raoul Dufy's portrait of the Kessler family, cousins of hers.

She died on 22 August 1988 while on holiday in Jersey and left nearly a million pounds sterling.

== Relatives ==
Aiton's uncle was the Dutch oil explorer Adriaan Stoop, and she was related to industrialist Dolf Kessler who in 1929 commissioned a home from innovative architect Hendrik Wouda.
