= Glenn Kessler (journalist) =

American journalist (born 1959)

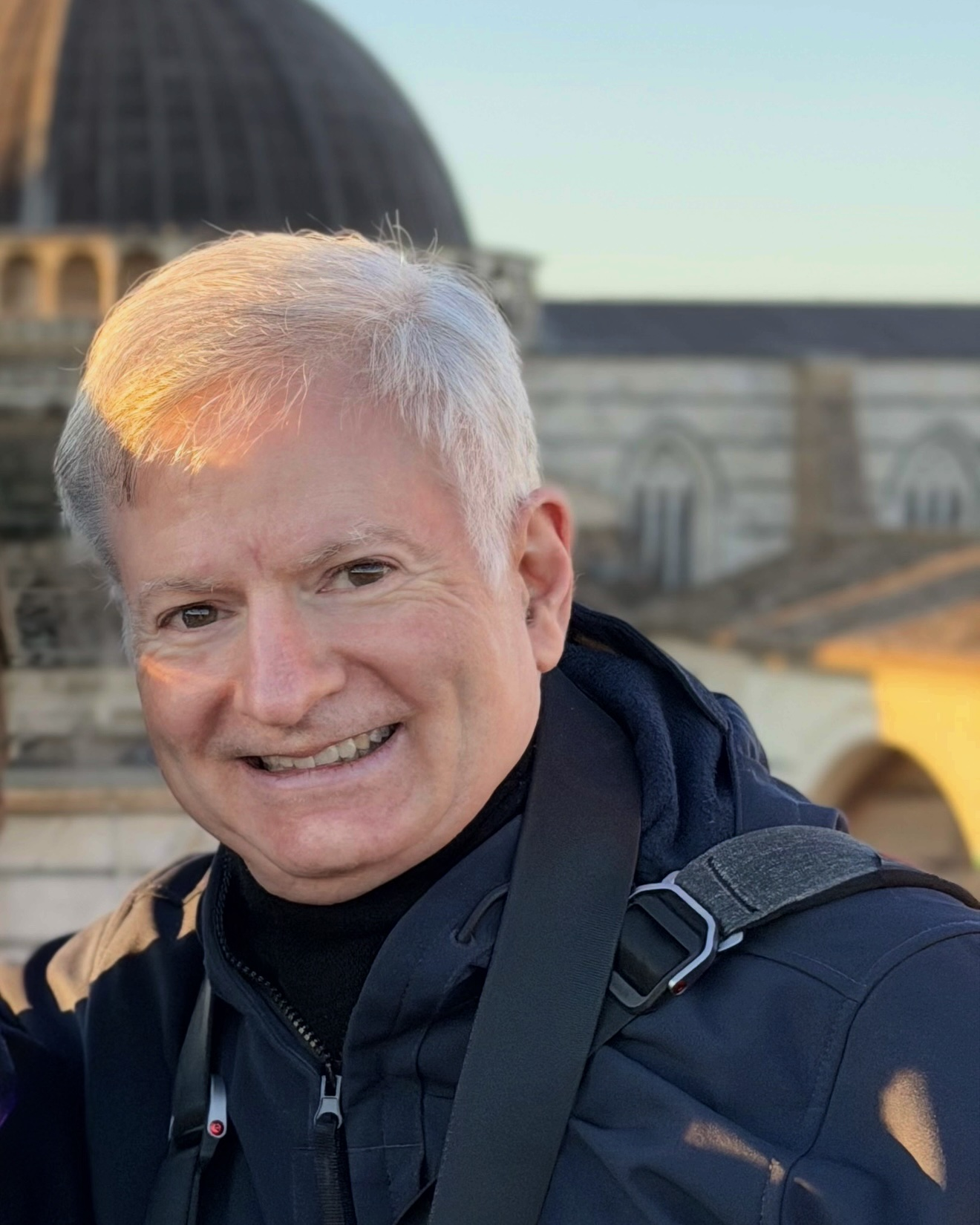
- Kessler in 2025
- Born: July 6, 1959 (age 67); Cincinnati, Ohio, U.S.
- Education: Brown University (BA); Columbia University (MIA)
- Occupations: Editor and writer
- Employer: The Washington Post (1998–2025)
- Notable work: The Confidante; Donald Trump and His Assault on Truth
- Family: Geldolph Adriaan Kessler (grandfather); Jean Baptiste August Kessler (great-grandfather); Adriaan Stoop (great-grandfather)

Glenn Kessler (born July 6, 1959) is an American editor and writer, most known for his work at The Washington Post from 1998 to 2025. He wrote a feature, "The Fact Checker", for The Washington Post from 2011 to 2025.

== Career ==
Kessler is a 1981 graduate of Brown University, and received a Masters of International Affairs in 1983 from the School of International and Public Affairs at Columbia University. Kessler is a member of the Council on Foreign Relations. Kessler joined The Washington Post in 1998 as the national business editor and later served as economic policy reporter for two years and diplomatic correspondent for nine years. Kessler also was a reporter with Newsday for eleven years, covering the White House, politics, the United States Congress, airline safety, and Wall Street. His article, which examined the government's failure to recognize that DC-9-10 jets were susceptible to stalling in icy conditions, won the Premier Award from the Aviation/Space Writers Association.

At Newsday, Kessler shared in two Pulitzer Prizes given for spot news reporting. Kessler played a role in two foreign policy controversies during the presidency of George W. Bush. He was called to testify in the trial of I. Lewis "Scooter" Libby, in which he was questioned about a 2003 telephone conversation with Libby in which the name of Valerie Plame, a CIA operative, might have been discussed. Libby recalled they had discussed Plame; Kessler said they did not. Meanwhile, a 2004 telephone conversation between Kessler and Steve J. Rosen, a senior official at American Israel Public Affairs Committee (AIPAC), was at the core of the AIPAC leaking case. The federal government recorded the call and made it the centerpiece of its 2005 indictment of Rosen and an alleged co-conspirator; the charges were dropped in 2009.

Kessler wrote the first article on the North Korea nuclear facility being built in Syria that was destroyed by Israeli jets. Kessler also wrote about the Bush administration's internal decision-making that led to the Iraq war. Kessler accepted a buyout after downsizing at The Washington Post, with his final column published on July 31, 2025. The next month, he joined Sourcebase.ai, an artificial-intelligence company for media founded by journalist Ron Suskind.

== Washington Post Fact Checker ==
In his Washington Post "Fact Checker" column, Kessler rated statements by politicians, usually on a range of one to four Pinocchios – with one Pinocchio for what he argued were minor shading of the facts and four Pinocchios for what he judged as outright lies. If he judged that the statement was truthful, the person would get a rare "Geppetto". Kessler had a new column at least five times a week; one column appeared every week in the Sunday print edition of The Washington Post. Kessler's team included another reporter and a video producer, who also wrote fact checks edited by Kessler.

Kessler, who took charge of the Fact Checker column in January 2011, is considered one of the pioneers in political fact checking, a movement that inspired nearly 300 fact-checking organizations in 83 countries, according to a tally by the Duke Reporters' Lab. In 1996, while at Newsday, "Kessler wrote what may have been the first lengthy fact-check story in a major American newspaper, a preemptive guide to a debate between Bill Clinton and Bob Dole aimed at helping viewers evaluate the claims they were about to hear." He documented the growth of fact checking around the world in an article for Foreign Affairs magazine, written after training journalists in Morocco.

James Taranto of The Wall Street Journal has criticized the whole idea of awarding Pinocchios as akin to movie-reviewing, saying "the 'fact check' is opinion journalism or criticism, masquerading as straight news." The conservative Power Line political blog devoted three articles to critiquing one of Kessler's articles, calling him a "liberal reporter", and asserting that "these 'fact-checkers' nearly always turn out to be liberal apologists who don a false mantle of objectivity in order to advance the cause of the Democratic Party." Kessler's awarding of Four Pinocchios to GOP presidential candidate Herman Cain for comments he made on Margaret Sanger and the founding of Planned Parenthood was also criticized by opponents of abortion. Yet Power Line also said that Kessler's extensive review of Democratic charges that Romney was a "flip-flopper" turned out to be "admirably fair-minded".

The liberal blog Talking Points Memo took Kessler to task for giving Four Pinocchios to a Democratic web petition on Medicare, saying the errors he allegedly made "were not just small misses, but big belly flop misses." The Obama White House issued a statement titled "Fact Checking the Fact Checker" after Kessler gave Obama Three Pinocchios for statements he made on the auto industry bailout. The Democratic National Committee released a statement denouncing "Kessler's hyperbolic, over the top fact check of the DNC's assertion that Mitt Romney supports private Social Security accounts."

During the 2016 United States presidential election campaign, the comic strip Doonesbury highlighted the vast disparity in Pinocchios given to Donald Trump versus Clinton. Kessler also appeared in a segment of The Daily Show about fact-checking Trump. "In terms of fact checking, Hillary Clinton is like playing chess with a real pro", he told Jordan Klepper. "Fact-checking Donald Trump is like playing checkers, with somebody who's not very good at it. It's pretty boring. His facts are so easily disproved there's no joy in hunt."

=== Database of false or misleading Trump claims ===
Shortly after Trump became President, Kessler announced a 100-day project to list every false and misleading statement made by Trump while in office. Kessler's team counted 492 untruths in the first 100 days, or an average of 4.9 per day. In response to reader requests, Kessler decided to keep it going for Trump's first year and then his entire presidency. By January 20, 2021, the end of Trump's four-year term, Kessler and his colleagues had counted 30,573 untruths, or an average of 21 a day. "Trump averaged about six claims a day in his first year as president, 16 claims day in his second year, 22 claims day in his third year – and 39 claims a day in his final year", Kessler wrote. "Put another way, it took him 27 months to reach 10,000 claims and another 14 months to reach 20,000. He then exceeded the 30,000 mark less than five months later." The database has drawn nationwide attention and been the subject of academic research. "Kessler is doing the poet's work. Honor him", wrote New York Times columnist Roger Cohen. "The database he compiles with his colleagues Salvador Rizzo and Meg Kelly, listing every one of Trump's untruths, will become a reference, a talisman."

Because of the Trump database, Kessler and the Fact Checker Team were nominated in 2020 by the Arthur L. Carter Journalism Institute at New York University for inclusion in a list of the Top Ten Works of Journalism of the Decade. The nomination said, "A rigorously reported and continually updated list of false statements by the president, numbering more than 19,000 by June 2020. The project is a sterling example of what journalists should do – holding the powerful accountable by using reporting and facts." Earlier in 2018, Kessler and his team were also nominated by The Washington Post for a Pulitzer Prize.

On April 22, 2020, The Washington Post announced that Kessler and his team had written a book, Donald Trump and His Assault on Truth: The President's Falsehoods, Misleading Claims and Flat-Out Lies, to be published June 2 by Scribner. The announcement said, "More than a catalogue of false claims, Donald Trump and His Assault on Truth is a necessary guide to understanding the motives behind the president's falsehoods." In a starred review, Kirkus Reviews called the book "an extremely valuable chronicle". The book appeared on Publisher Weekly's top ten best-seller list. Kessler created a database of Joe Biden's false or misleading claims, but only for the first 100 days of his presidency. Kessler tweeted, "I have learned my lesson. 'Learned my lesson' means who knows what the next four years will bring. We have fact-checked Biden rigorously and will continue to do so. Trump at 500 claims/100 days was manageable; 8,000+ was not."

=== Controversy over Bernie Sanders fact checks ===
In August 2018, Kessler came under fire for his coverage of a Mercatus Center study on the perceived costs of Senator Bernie Sanders's Medicare for All plan. Kessler released corrections to his fact check, which stated the Sanders's claims of $2.1 trillion in 10-year National Health Expenditure savings were cherry-picked. Kessler did not change his Three-Pinocchio rating, and his findings were affirmed by other fact-checking organizations, including PolitiFact, FactCheck.org, and the Associated Press. In February 2021, Kessler was criticized by socialist magazine Jacobin for an article he wrote in which he rated a statement by Senator Sanders, in which Sanders had declared that the Tax Cuts and Jobs Act of 2017 had only benefited the wealthy, as three pinocchios. Jacobin criticized Kessler for what they perceived as him ignoring data in his article, and accused him of writing it in order to benefit Amazon CEO Jeff Bezos, who owns The Washington Post.

=== Claim about definition of the word "millions" ===
In 2019, Kessler was criticized by AlterNet "for applying bizarrely specific standards to statements and sometimes calling obviously true statements 'misleading' if he doesn't like what they imply." For example, when Bernie Sanders said that “millions” of Americans were working more than one job, Kessler cited Bureau of Labor Statistics data showing that nearly 8 million people held more than one job, but rated Sanders's statement as "misleading" because these 8 million people were just 5 percent of Americans with jobs. Kessler responded to the criticism, "Since there was some Twitter outrage about this assessment, please note that this is a summary of a previous fact check, in which we said Sanders had the 'most accurate sound bite' on this issue among Democrats running for president." He then provided a link to the original column.

=== Fact check about rape and abortion ===
In July 2022, Kessler was criticized for calling into question, with little evidence, a report of an abortion by a 10-year-old child from Ohio. The report was later exhaustively confirmed by reporters and public records requests. Washington Post spokeswoman Shani George told the Associated Press, "The intent of the piece was to spotlight the need for careful reporting in a time when information spreads rapidly." In his article, Kessler wrote, "None of the officials we reached were aware of such a case in their areas." A subsequent Freedom of Information Act request revealed a previous email exchange between Kessler and officials at Children Services for Franklin County, where the alleged assault occurred in which the FCCS replied, "Their agency could not comment on specific cases, because this information is treated as confidential under Ohio law." In a correction, The Washington Post said "an email the county spokeswoman sent was inadvertently missed during the reporting." After leaving The Washington Post in 2025, Kessler wrote on Substack that he thought it would have been "appropriate to publicly apologize to the child and the doctor who conducted the abortion" but "felt muzzled" by the newspaper.

=== Fact checks examining biographical claims ===
Kessler conducted a number of fact checks that examined biographical claims. He wrote in 2018 that House Republican leader Kevin McCarthy's claim of being a small-business entrepreneur — "my own deli" — was exaggerated; McCarthy only had a counter in his uncle's yogurt shop for a year. Kessler wrote many fact checks of claims that President Joe Biden made about his life, including whether he was arrested trying to see Nelson Mandela, or arrested while advocating civil rights.

Some of Kessler's biographical fact checks were criticized by their subjects. Reverend Robert W. Lee IV had stated in The Washington Post, in a lawsuit, and at public events that he was a great-great-great-great nephew of Robert E. Lee; in 2021, Kessler said a review of historical and genealogical records found there is "no evidence that Rob Lee, who was born in North Carolina, is related to Robert E. Lee." Kessler traced Lee's roots to a confederate soldier in Alabama called Robert S. Lee. In response, Lee said he had withdrawn from the lawsuit. But 8 months later Rob Lee said a 400-page family genealogy report gathered by a hired genealogist had found ties to Lee. The Washington Post said he declined to provide a copy of the report for examination by the newspaper.

Also in 2021, Kessler said he had examined property and census records regarding the family of Senator Tim Scott of South Carolina, discovering that Scott's great-grandfather was a substantial landowner. Kessler wrote, "Scott tells a tidy story packaged for political consumption, but a close look shows how some of his family's early and improbable success gets flattened and written out of his biography. Against heavy odds, Scott's ancestors amassed relatively large areas of farmland, a mark of distinction in the Black community at the time." Scott denounced the article, referring to it in his response to President Biden's address to Congress that "a national newspaper suggested my family's poverty was actually privilege because a relative owned land generations before my time." Other commentators also criticized the report. Kessler said in an interview with National Public Radio, "I was really surprised by the intensity of the reaction, much of which was fanned by Fox News. Not in any way did I ever suggest in the piece that Scott's great-grandfather lived a privileged life. I mean, after all, this is the Jim Crow South we're talking about."

== Awards and honors ==
After addressing the Kentucky General Assembly in 2019 on behalf of its ethics commission, Kessler was named a Kentucky Colonel, the state's highest honor, for his contributions to the nation. Kessler noted on Twitter that he had awarded Four Pinocchios to the two people who had signed the declaration: Gov. Matt Bevin and Secretary of State Alison Lundergan Grimes. Also in 2019, he won an Honorable Mention to the S. I. Newhouse School of Public Communications at Syracuse University's Toner Prize for Excellence in Political Reporting. Kessler and The Washington Post Fact Checker team were honored for the Fact Checker's database of Trump's misleading claims; the judges praised fact checks that are "clear, deliberate and never hyperbolic.

In 2022, Kessler received the Sigma Delta Chi Award (2022) presented by the Society of Professional Journalists (SPJ) (formerly Sigma Delta Chi) for excellence in journalism, in the category of fact checking across all platforms. Kessler won for a series of fact checks on claims about Hunter Biden, the president's son. The announcement said, Kessler had provided "a very detailed, balanced analysis of a complicated and horrifically convoluted story that spawned a thousand rumors and falsehoods". In 2025, he won the Nellie Bly Award for Investigative Reporting (2025) presented by the Museum of Political Corruption. The museum president Bruce Roter said, "At a time when truth is often under attack, Mr. Kessler's work stands as a testament to the power of fact-based reporting."

== Personal life ==
A year after leaving The Post, Kessler announced he had moved from the Washington area, where he had lived more than 30 years, to New York City.

Kessler is a great-grandson of Jean Baptiste August Kessler, an oil industrialist who stood at the basis of the oil supermajor Shell, and a grandson of Geldolph Adriaan Kessler, who helped create the Dutch steel industry through his involvement with Hoogovens. He was born in Cincinnati, where his father, Adriaan Kessler, was an executive at Procter & Gamble, and he attended high school there (Walnut Hills High School) and in Lexington, Kentucky. Kessler's mother, Else Bolotin, was a psychologist, who in Lexington "helped women in that era of feminist awakening confront a society dominated by men." Both of his parents were Dutch, and immigrated to the United States after marriage.

== Books ==
- The Confidante: Condoleezza Rice and the Creation of the Bush Legacy New York : Saint Martin's Press, 2007. ISBN 978-0312363802
- Donald Trump and His Assault on Truth: The President's Falsehoods, Misleading Claims and Flat-Out Lies New York : Scribner, 2020. ISBN 978-1982151072

== See also ==
- False or misleading statements by Donald Trump

== Sources ==
- Stewart, James B. (2011). Tangled Webs: How False Statements are Undermining America: From Martha Stewart to Bernie Madoff. Penguin Press. ISBN 978-1-59420-269-8.
- Graves, Lucas (2016). Deciding What's True: The Rise of Political Fact-Checking in American Journalism. Columbia University Press. ISBN 978-0-23117-507-4.
