= Tim Stoop =

- Full name: Frederick MacFarlane Stoop
- Born: 17 September 1888 Kensington, England
- Died: 24 November 1972 (aged 84) SW Surrey, England
- School: Rugby School
- Notable relative: Adrian Stoop (brother)

Rugby union career
- Position: Centre
International career
Years	Team	Apps	(Points)
1910–13	England	4	(0)

Frederick MacFarlane "Tim" Stoop (17 September 1888 – 24 November 1972) was an English international rugby union player of the 1910s.

Born in Kensington, London, Stoop was one of seven children and received his education at Rugby School. He came from a wealthy family. His Dutch-born father, Frederick C. Stoop, was a millionaire who made his money in the oil industry, and like his brother Frank was an arts patron of some renown.

Stoop, a centre, played his rugby for Harlequins and won four national caps from 1910 to 1913, the first three as a teammate of his elder brother Adrian Stoop, England's stand-off.

During World War I, Stoop was an East Kent Regiment officer and suffered shrapnel wounds in 1916.

== See also ==
- List of England national rugby union players
