= Deterding =

Deterding is a surname. Notable people with the surname include:

- Henri Deterding (1866–1939), Dutch business executive
- Olga Deterding (1927–1978), British heiress and socialite
