= Pangkalan Brandan =

Town in Langkat Regency, Indonesia

Coordinates: 4°01′N 98°17′E

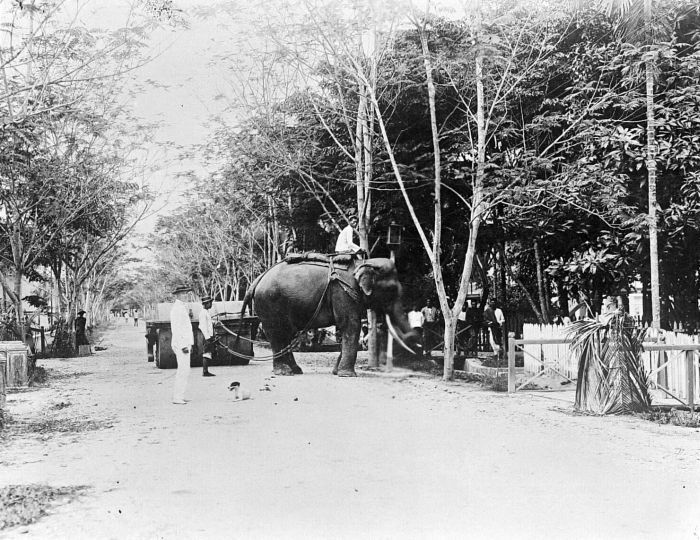
- Elephant transporting timber in Pangkalan Brandan in the 1920s
- Interactive map of Pangkalan Brandan

Pangkalan Brandan (or Pangkalanbrandan) (Pangkalanberandan) is a port town in Langkat Regency, North Sumatra province, Indonesia, forty miles north west of Medan, close to the boundary with Aceh. The area's population is estimated at 21,000.

== History ==
Oil seepages were known in the archipelago since antiquity, the small ponds containing a mineral wax used for lighting torches and caulking boats. In 1880, East Sumatra Tobacco Company's Aeilko Jans Zijlker discovered these deposits contained up to 62 percent kerosene. Acquiring a concession from the Sultan of Langkat, near the Balaban River called Telaga Said, Zijlker's Provisional Sumatra Petroleum Company drilled the first successful oil well in 1885, called Telega Tunggal No 1. Seeking capital in 1890, Zijlker issued stock in "Royal Dutch Company for the Working of Petroleum Wells in the Dutch Indies", after William III of the Netherlands granted him the license to use the royal title. After Zijlker's sudden death in 1890, Jean Baptiste August Kessler took over management of operations in 1891. A refinery on the Balaban River, connected by a 6-mile pipeline to the wells, was operational in 1892.

Pangkalan Brandan was noted to be the first area of Indonesia which supported the development of other areas with its rich oil supply, its well can be traced as the origin of the global oil giant Royal Dutch Shell. There has been a proposal to use waste from the local palm oil industry to generate electricity.
