= Oil reserves in Southeast Asia =

There are many oil reserves in Southeast Asia. The first oil reserve to be found in Southeast Asia was found in 1883, and is now the site of the Telega Tiga oil well. Nowadays, the region produces almost 2 million barrels of oil per day.

== Historical ==
The historical records of Southeastern Asian oil started in 1883, when a Dutch planter A.J. Zijiker, was exploring the exterior of Sumatra, an Indonesian island, when he was struck by a tropical storm. Seeking shelter on a nearby island, Zijiker witnessed a Sumatran local watchman light a fire from wet twigs using a bamboo torch. Naturally curious, the planter inquired about the burning capabilities of the torch and was soon after taken to a small pond filled with the black fluid. In the year following, Zijiker commenced the drilling of the now-well known Telega Tila oil well in Northern Sumatra. It was from this well that Royal Dutch Shell was formed. It is generally understood that Zijilker's endeavour and others similar to it catalyzed the modern petroleum industry in Southeast Asia and connected the region's resources to the world's energy markets.

Though off-shore drilling was not a practise first used in Southeast Asia and in China, attitudes changed after petroleum drilling in the Gulf of Mexico proved to a highly lucrative endeavour in the years following World War II. Because of the vast areas of relatively shallow waters surrounding Indonesia and Southeastern Asian countries, drilling in these areas was a clear and easy conclusion to draw. Shell, the first to discover oil in these areas, naturally brought the first offshore drilling rig here, specifically to the Brunei coast in 1958. Brunei would later evolve into a joint venture owned in equal shares by the Brunei Government and the Royal Dutch/Shell group of companies.

== Current situation ==
Today, Southeast Asia is some of the most active area of offshore exploration in the world. The impetus behind this in recent decades can be largely attributed to three phenomena: technological innovations in the industry, political developments in Southeast Asia and the Middle East, and the emergence of Japan as a hot-spot for petroleum trade operations.

At this moment, Southeast Asia produces nearly 2 million barrels per day (as well as 500 million cubic feet of natural gas). However, the region's main oil producers, Indonesia, Malaysia and Vietnam, are planning for a future as oil importers as their oil output declines and domestic demand rises. As Indonesia became a net importer of oil, the country declared its own suspension from OPEC in 2008.

== List of oil fields ==
=== Brunei ===
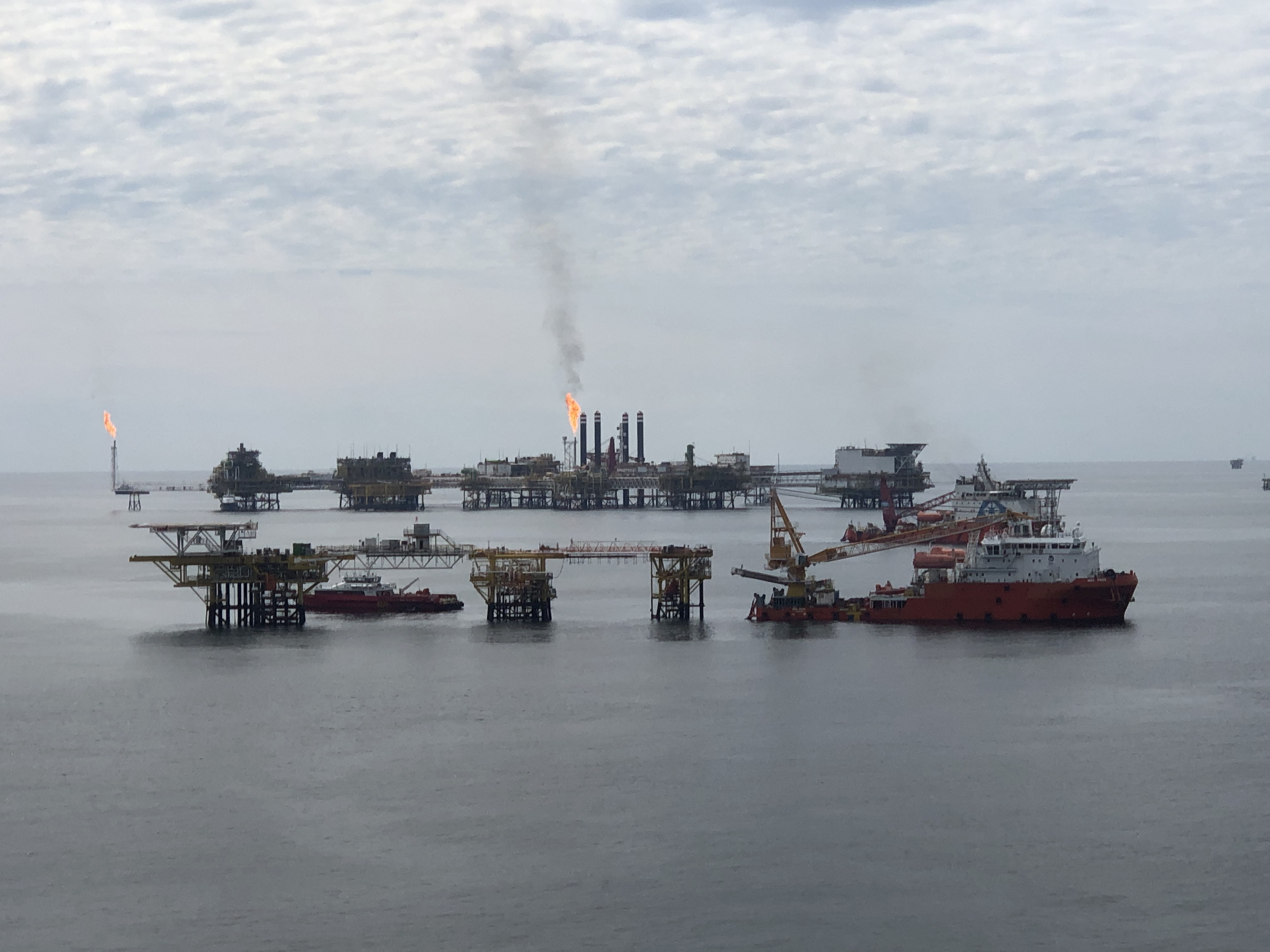
The Champion oil field in 2020

- Champion oil field
- Egret oil field, Brunei
- Rasau
- Seria oil field

=== Indonesia ===
- Bula Fields, near Bula, Indonesia
- Telega Tunggal No 1

=== Malaysia ===
- Ambalat

=== Philippines ===
- Alegria oil field

=== Vietnam ===
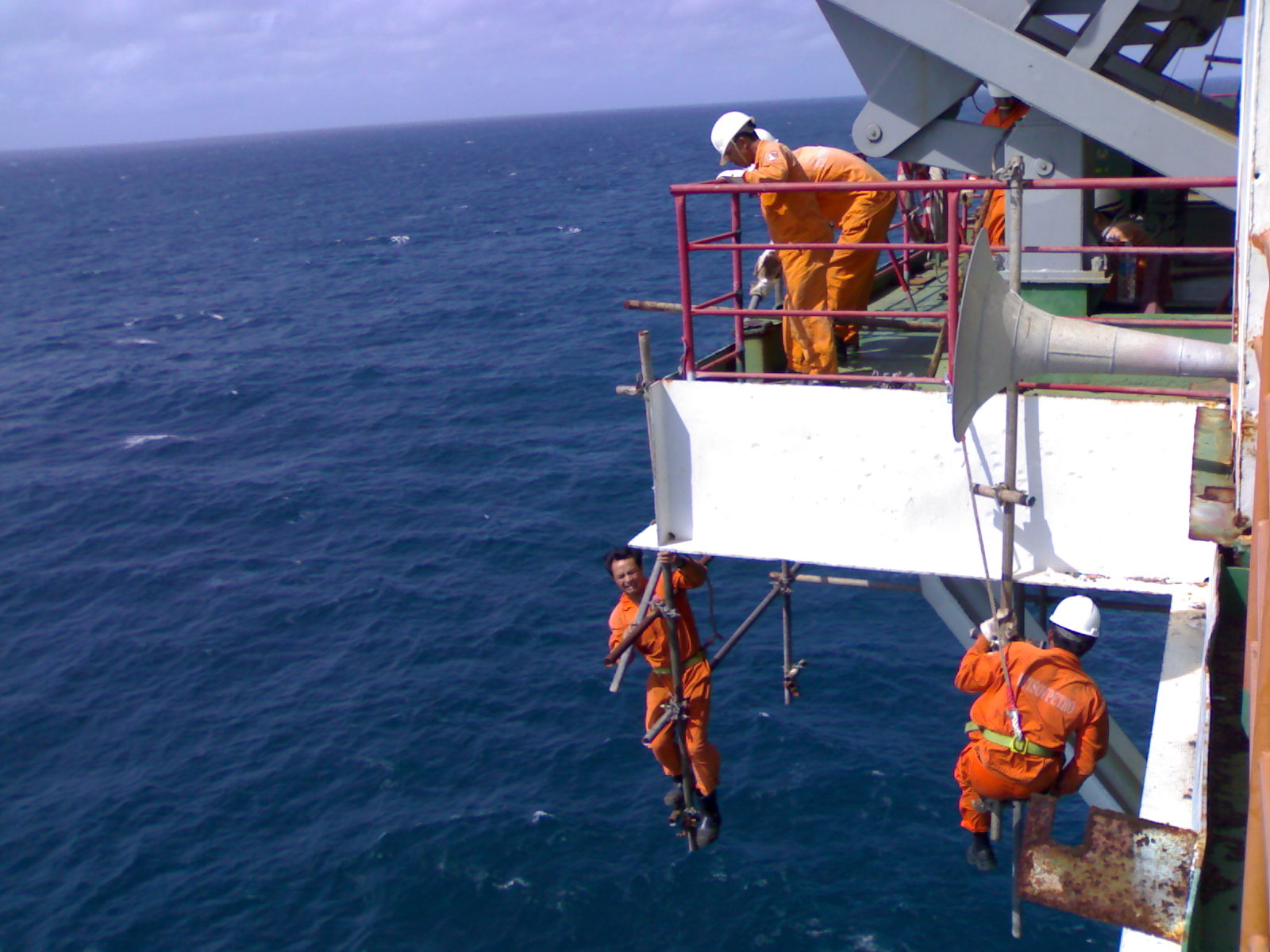
The Bạch Hổ oil field in 2007

- Bạch Hổ oil field
- Đại Hùng oilfield
- Tê Giác Trắng oilfield
