= Twickenham Stoop =

Sports stadium in London

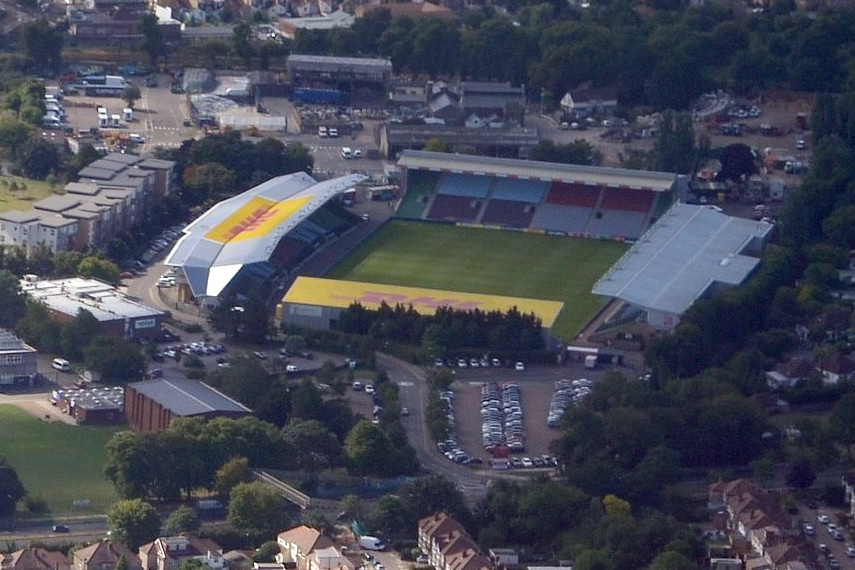
- Interactive map of Twickenham Stoop
- Full name: Twickenham Stoop Stadium
- Location: Twickenham, London; United Kingdom
- Coordinates: 51°27′1″N 0°20′39″W
- Owner: Harlequin Estates (Twickenham) Limited
- Capacity: 14,800
- Public transit: Whitton; Twickenham

Construction
- Built: 1963; 63 years ago
- Opened: 1963; 63 years ago

Tenants
- Rugby Union; Harlequins (1963–present); London Scottish (1998–1999); London Irish (1999–2000; 2020); Rugby League; London Broncos (1997–1999, 2006–2013)

Twickenham Stoop is a stadium in Twickenham, in the London Borough of Richmond upon Thames, close to Twickenham Stadium, England's national rugby union stadium. The Stoop is home to the Harlequins in Premiership Rugby and has a capacity of 14,800.

== History ==
=== Harlequins before the Stoop ===
In 1906, Harlequins were invited by the Rugby Football Union to use the new national stadium in Twickenham. In those early days, only one or two internationals at most were played there during the season, and it wasn't long before the RFU ground became the headquarters of the Harlequin Football Club.

=== Early days ===
In 1963, Harlequins acquired an athletics ground with 14 acres (57,000 m^{2}), sited just across the road from the RFU ground, which became the Harlequins training pitch. The ground was for many years named the Stoop Memorial Ground after Adrian Stoop, a former England international, longtime Harlequins player, and club president. In 2005, the club formally renamed it as Twickenham Stoop Stadium, but it is colloquially known simply as The Stoop, with even the Harlequins' official website frequently using the informal name.

=== The stadium today ===
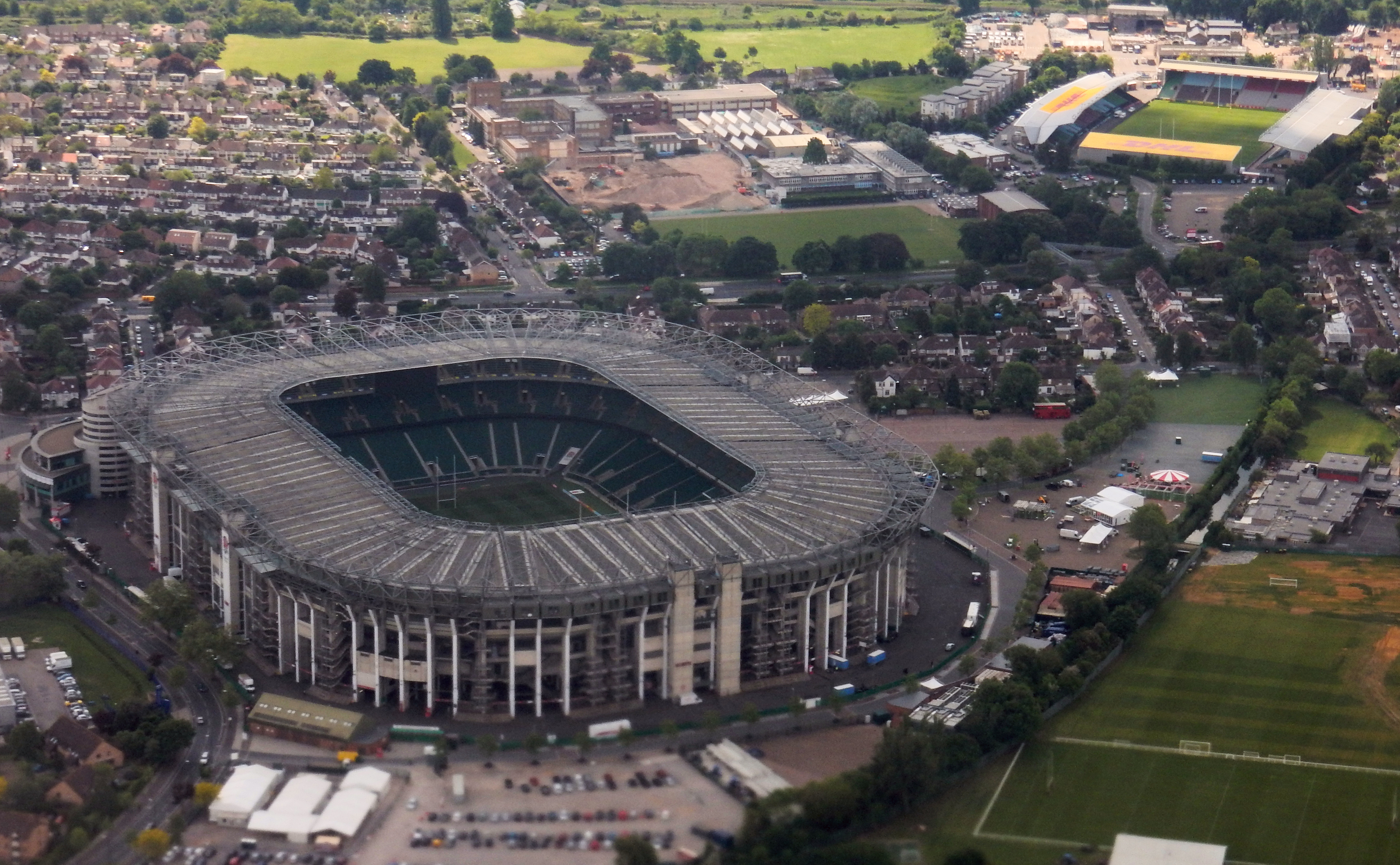
Twickenham Stadium (bottom left) and The Twickenham Stoop (top right)

==== Accounts IQ Stand ====
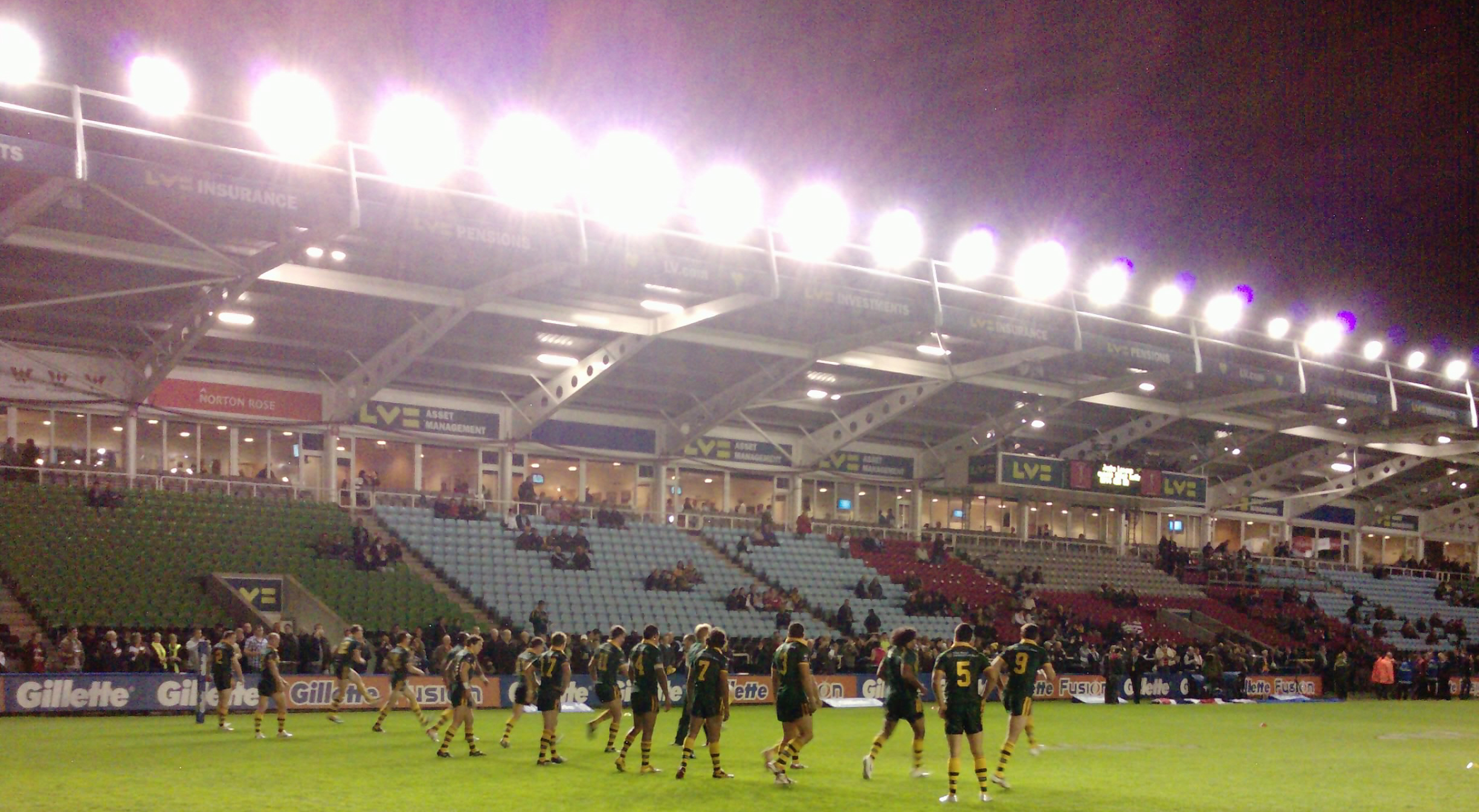
The Accounts IQ stand (Formally the Charles Stanley Stand). Pre-match at the Four Nations game between the Kangaroos and the Kiwis

Constructed for the start of the 2005–06 season, the Accounts IQ Stand (West Stand) (Formally the Charles Stanley Stand) is the Stoop's main stand, with a capacity of approximately 4,000. This stand has the changing rooms, a row of executive boxes across the top of the stand, a Members' Bar, the club's offices, toilets and a club shop. At the top of the stand under the roof there is also a scoreboard and a gantry where the television cameras populate.

==== DHL Stand ====
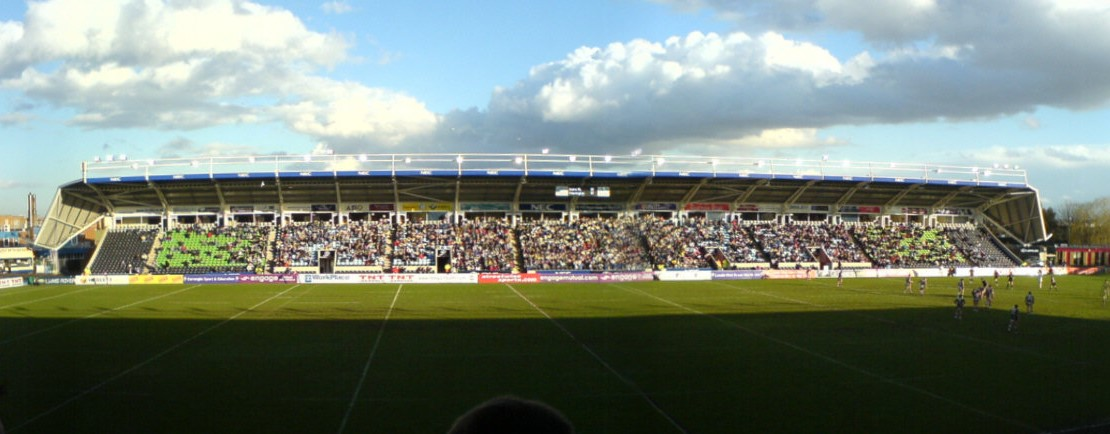
The DHL Stand

The DHL Stand (East Stand) has a capacity of approximately 4,000 and has a row of corporate boxes across the top. The East Stand was the first to be constructed as part of the 1997 redevelopment of The Stoop. A score board also hangs under the roof. The stand has toilets, the main public bar, Debenture Lounge and Players' Lounge. The area is also home to the "Mighty Quins Village" which is an area for children which consists of bouncy castle and face painting. The main public bar also has a stage where a live band performs after matches.

==== The Fullers London Pride stand ====
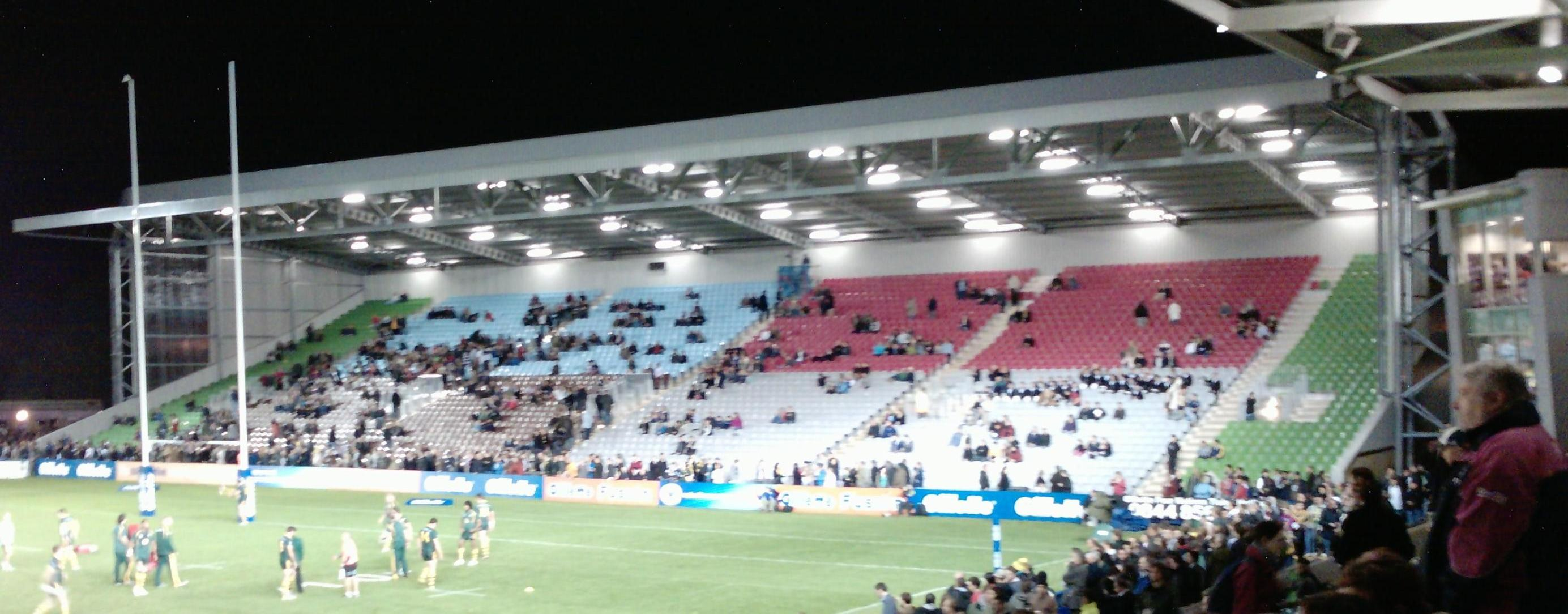
The new Fullers London Pride stand (formerly the south stand) pre-match at the Four Nations game between Australia and New Zealand

The Fullers London pride stand (formerly the south stand) was opened for the 2009–10 season. It has new toilets, a real ale bar, the Quins Head, which sells Fullers London Pride, guest ales and a club shop. The back of the stand also has a clock for the match. Until the 2022-2023 season it was named the south stand.

==== North Stand ====
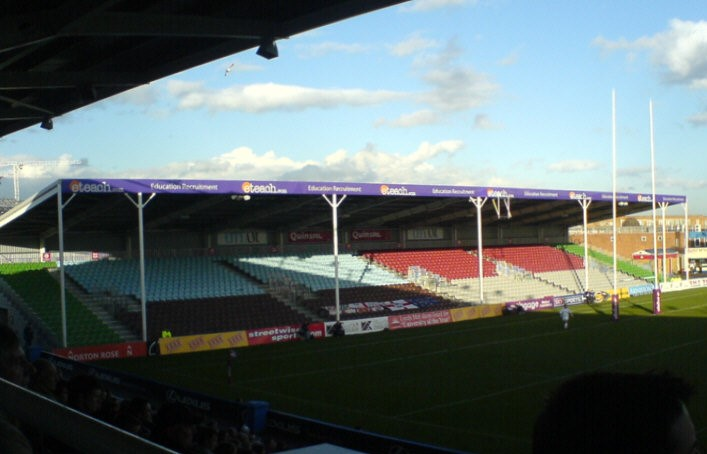
The North Stand

The North Stand is a temporary structure with an estimated life of 10 years, and is the most recent to be developed for the 2011–12 season. It houses approximately 2,000 and is the only stand with supporting pillars. There is a time clock to the top left of the stand. In the summer of 2022, new toilets were added and an indoor seating area with tables were added.

The corner of the North and Charles Stanley Stand has a memorial for Nick Duncombe who was a promising scrum half for Harlequins and won two caps for England. He also played for the England Sevens team in the 2002 Commonwealth Games. He died of meningitis in 2003.

== Redevelopment ==
The ground's official name changed in July 2005 from the Stoop Memorial Ground to Twickenham Stoop Stadium.

The club owns the ground freehold through its subsidiary Harlequin Estates (Twickenham) Limited. According to the 2012 annual report submitted by the club's operating company to Companies House, in 2010 external valuers placed the combined value of the land and buildings at £27.19 million on a depreciated replacement cost basis.

In an interview with the fans website on 23 April 2012, the Chief Executive, David Ellis confirmed that an architect has visited the club and given ideas on possible improvement and further expansion of The Stoop which will be further considered if Harlequins can sell out nine or ten games a season in comparison with the six games sold out in the 2011–12 season. David Ellis also said there are some immediate concerns for development such as increasing the size of the debenture lounge and the members bar. He also mentioned the queues for drinks at the bars are too long so that will be looked into as well.

On 5 September 2012 Harlequins announced that they had begun a programme of significant investment in upgrading Twickenham Stoop Stadium. All four of the stands have been deep cleaned, this has included the installation of anti-roosting netting that features an unobtrusive fine mesh, secured high in the stands that will prevent damage to the seats and decking caused by the local pigeon population. Replacement of the broken or sun-bleached seating has also commenced and eventually all seating will be replaced block by block in a rolling programme over the coming seasons. The public areas of the stands, including the toilets, are also in the process of being decorated and upgraded. Four new turnstiles have been constructed at Gate 3 by the corner of the Fullers London Pride and DHL Stand to improve access and a new PA system to improve sound quality throughout the stadium. The hospitality facilities in the DHL and Charles Stanley Stands have also undergone renovations and redecorations. Among the major improvements about to begin is the resurfacing of the North car park.

=== Current redevelopment plans ===
In November 2017, Harlequins unveiled plans to build a new state-of-the-art 25,000-seat stadium on the same Twickenham site. The project, which is being led by architects Populous, is expected to cost in the region of £50m. Concrete plans have not yet been released, and consultation with the local community and Richmond Council is currently ongoing.

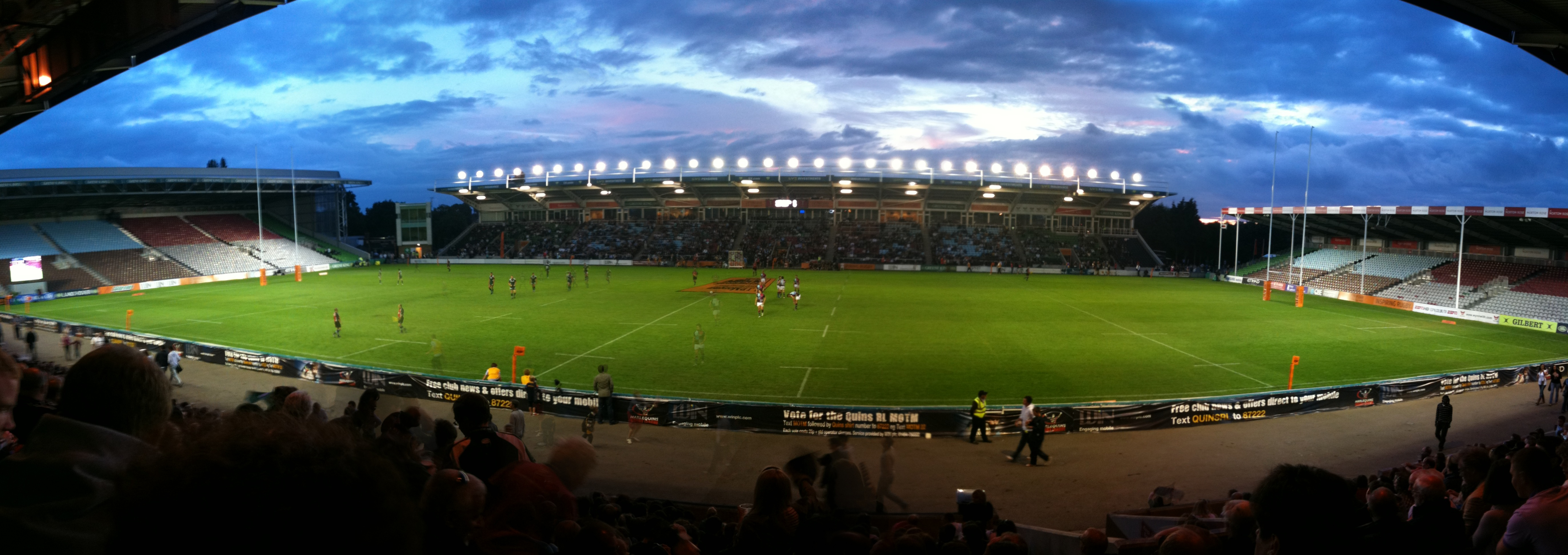
LV Stand with the South Stand (left) and North Stand (right), 2010

== Rugby League ==
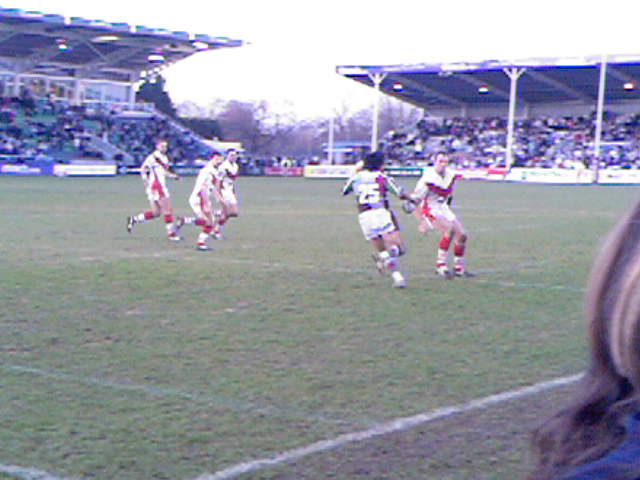
Harlequins RL vs St Helens in 2006

In 1995–96 and again from 1997 to 1999, the rugby league club, London Broncos, joined Harlequins at The Stoop, and they returned again in 2006–2013, becoming Harlequins RL. In 2006 the stadium held a Harlequins rugby union match and a Harlequins rugby league game on the same day. The rugby union match was played first, and in just a few hours the stadium was switched over for the Super League match. This involved changing field markings, advertising boardings and such.

Between 2006 and 2011, The Stoop hosted the annual Rugby League Varsity Match between Oxford University and Cambridge University.

On 24 October 2009 the ground hosted the second match of the 2009 Rugby League Four Nations between world champions New Zealand and defending tournament champions (in Tri-Nations mode), Australia which resulted in a 20-all draw, 12,360 people attended the game making it the largest rugby league crowd at the venue beating the 1997 World Club Championship match between the London Broncos and Canberra Raiders where 7,819 people attended.

After eleven seasons of not playing at The Stoop, the London Broncos took their round 14 match of the 2024 Super League season against St Helens to the ground. St Helens would win the match 52-6.

== Women's International Rugby Union ==
The ground played host to the final of the 2010 Women's Rugby World Cup.

In 2015, it began hosting what was intended to be an annual event in the World Rugby Women's Sevens Series. All matches were held at The Stoop except for the third-place match and Cup final, which were played at Twickenham Stadium. However, the Women's Sevens Series did not return to London for 2015–16.

The Stoop has become a regular venue for England Women's games, hosting Six Nations games and Autumn International Series games.

On 17 January 2016 The Stoop hosted the Women's Premiership final, for the first time.

== Concert venue ==
In the summer of 2017, The Stoop hosted its first music concerts, with the aim of diversifying the range of events hosted, establishing itself as a music venue, as well as sports. The Stoop has hosted artists such as Elton John and Little Mix.

== See also ==
- Harlequin Football Club
- Harlequin Ladies Football Club
- Twickenham Stadium
