= Tonny Kessler =

Dutch footballer (1889–1960)

Personal information
- Full name: Hermann Anton Joseph Kessler
- Date of birth: 20 April 1889
- Place of birth: The Hague, Netherlands
- Date of death: 15 February 1960 (aged 70)
- Place of death: Netherlands
- Position: Forward

Senior career*
Years	Team	Apps	(Gls)
1904-1923	HVV Den Haag	328	(131)

International career
1907–1913	Netherlands	3	(1)
- * Club domestic league appearances and goals

Hermann Anton Joseph "Tonny" Kessler (20 April 1889 – 15 February 1960) was a Dutch footballer. Kessler, along with brother Dé and cousins Boeli and Dolf, played club football for amateur side HVV Den Haag. Kessler won three caps for the Netherlands national side between 1907 and 1913, scoring one goal. After playing alongside each other in a match against England in March 1913, the Kessler brothers became the first brothers to represent the Netherlands together in an international match.
