= Dé Kessler =

Dutch footballer and cricketer (1891–1943)

Personal information
- Full name: Johann Heinrich Hermann Kessler
- Date of birth: 11 August 1891
- Place of birth: Garut, Dutch East Indies
- Date of death: 6 September 1943 (aged 52)
- Place of death: Netherlands

Senior career*
Years	Team	Apps	(Gls)
1904–1920	HVV Den Haag	328	(121)

International career
1909–1922	Netherlands	21	(9)
- * Club domestic league appearances and goals

Johann Heinrich Hermann "Dé" Kessler (11 August 1891 – 6 September 1943) was a Dutch football and cricket player.

== Football ==
Kessler - along with brother Tonny and cousins Boeli and Dolf - played club football for amateur side HVV Den Haag. Kessler also won 21 caps for the Netherlands national side between 1909 and 1922, scoring nine goals. After playing alongside each other in a match against England in March 1913, the Kessler brothers became the first brothers to represent the Netherlands together in an international match.

== Cricket ==
Kessler played for the Netherlands national team. He played five matches for them between 1921 and 1925, including two against the Free Foresters and one against the MCC. In August 1922 he scored a century against Ingoniti, scoring 100 not out in the second innings of the match.
