= Jonathan Routh =

English painter

- Born: John Reginald Surdeval Routh; November 24, 1927; Gosport, Hampshire, United Kingdom
- Died: July 4, 2008 (aged 80); Jamaica
- Spouse(s): Nandi Heckroth (m. 1948, divorced) Shelagh Marvin (m. 1975)
- Children: 2

Jonathan Routh (born John Reginald Surdeval Routh; 24 November 1927 – 4 June 2008) was a British comedian, television presenter, actor, writer, and painter. He starred in a British version of the television show Candid Camera from 1960 to 1967, and co-starred with Germaine Greer and Kenny Everett in a later attempt at a revival, Nice Time, in 1968. He published a number of humorous books, and painted for many years.

== Background and personal life ==
Routh was born on 24 November 1927 in Gosport, Hampshire, the son of a British Army colonel, and spent much of his early childhood in Palestine. He was educated at Uppingham School and Emmanuel College, Cambridge, where he read history.

Routh had two sons from his first marriage (to the film designer Nandi Heckroth, in 1948), had a relationship in 1969 with the wife of Paul Hamlyn, and then another with the oil heiress Olga Deterding. He died in Jamaica on 4 June 2008.

== Television work ==
Following a success with a British version of The Candid Microphone on Radio Luxembourg, Routh started a British version of its television successor Candid Camera around 1961 for ABC Weekend TV. Following a long dispute with the American lawyers of Allen Funt as to who held the rights to Candid Camera, Routh moved on to new fields, working with John Birt, later director general of the BBC, for Granada TV, along with Germaine Greer and Kenny Everett in Nice Time. He also worked in television advertising on spots such as J. Walter Thompson's for Smarties and Kellogg's Corn flakes, appearing also in some spots himself, for example Newcastle Brown Ale. The British version of Candid Camera returned in 1974, starring Peter Dulay, Arthur Atkins and Sheila Bernette. In 1976, Routh returned to the pranks and the show was retitled Jonathan Routh & Candid Camera.

== Guidebooks created with John Glashan ==
With John Glashan, Routh created an unusual set of small guidebooks: The Good Loo Guide and The Good Cuppa Guide (both about London), The Guide Porcelaine to the Loos of Paris, and The Better John Guide (about New York City). The humour owed much to the apparent seriousness, and to the affectionate parody of the connoisseurship of The Good Food Guide (then as now a trove of information on fine eating).

=== The Good Loo Guide ===
The Good Loo Guide, a compact fifty-page booklet subtitled "Where to Go in London", written with Brigid Segrave and "conveniently illustrated" by John Glashan, was the first of the series, published in London by Wolfe in 1965. A note on the copyright page sets the tone:

This is an impartial guide. Our visits to loos have been anonymous. We have not declared ourselves even after making use of the establishment's facilities. Nor have we at any time accepted hospitality, but paid cash for all chargeable facilities we have used.

Loos are rated by the application of stars, three-star establishments being "worth travelling out of your way to experience". The illustrations are numerous as well as convenient, with Glashan's characters (typically bearded men) experiencing various adventures and misadventures.

In the "completely new & revised" edition of 1968, more is included, and ten establishments earn a new award, the "Good Loo Royal Flush".

Two decades later, Routh (but not Glashan) would re-examine this issue with the Initial Good Loo Guide, on which see below.

=== The Good Cuppa Guide ===
The Good Cuppa Guide: Where to Have Tea in London, published in 1966, was "blended" by Routh and "milked and sugared" by Glashan. The format and charm (and, in its day, usefulness) are those of the Good Loo Guide. Providers of cuppas are rated with a maximum of five stars.

=== Guide Porcelaine to the Loos of Paris ===
Its title echoing that of the Guide Michelin, Guide Porcelaine to the Loos of Paris (1966) was similar to the London guide but additionally provided convenient phrases for the nervous British tourist. An example: "Donnez-moi les ordres simples pour atteindre le pissoir le plus pres d'ici; et, s'il vous plait, sans les gesticulations sauvages et tumultueuses", (Note: No diacritics in the original.) i.e. "Please direct me to the nearest loo in simple terms and without waving your hands in too dangerous a manner."

A French translation also appeared: Guide porcelaine des "lieux" de Paris (Editions de la Jeune Parque, 1967).

=== The Better John Guide ===
Unlike the three-and-sixpenny (3s 6d, 17½p) booklets described above, The Better John Guide: Where to Go in New York (New York: Putnam, 1966) was a $2.50 hardback. Written with Serena Stewart, it had "graffiti" by Glashan, largely recycled from the "convenient" illustrations of The Good Loo Guide. Some of the text was recycled too — understandably so, as neither work was likely to have been known in the other city.

== Art ==
Routh also painted for many years, concentrating on depicting the Queen Victoria of his imagination and nuns, as he claimed to be unable to paint faces, arms or legs. He exhibited regularly in Jamaica, Italy and the United States; as of early 2008, his paintings were also on display in what had been his favourite restaurant, San Lorenzo in Beauchamp Place, London. In March 2008, Routh issued limited editions of his original paintings through Chisholm Gallery. Jonathan Routh has been represented by Chisholm Gallery, LLC for over 35 years.

Routh's paintings of nuns and Queen Victoria were turned into a number of books:

- Jamaica Holiday: The secret life of Queen Victoria. London: Harmony Hall, 1984. Originally featured in The Secret Life of Queen Victoria. Her Majesty's Missing Diaries. London: Sidgwick and Jackson Ltd. 1979.
- The Nuns Go to Africa. London: Methuen, 1971.
- The Nuns Go to Penguin Island. London: Methuen, 1971.
- The Nuns Go East. London: Methuen, 1972.
- The Nuns Go West. London: Methuen, 1972.

== Other books by Routh ==
- The Little Men in My Life. London: Barrie, 1953. (Reissued in 1962 as An Exhibition of Myself.)
- Captain d'Arcy's Filthy Picture Book. London: Wolfe, 1967.
- Dr. Crocker's Exercise Book. London: Wolfe, 1967.
- The Hangover Book: Prevention, preparation, treatment and cure. London: Wolfe, 1967.
- So You Think You've Got Problems: A book of disasters. London: Wolfe, 1967.
- Routh's Weekend Guide. London: Anthony Blond, 1969.
- Leonardo's Kitchen Notebooks with Shelagh Routh. London: Collins 1987. A humorous book made up from a fictional notes from Leonardo Da Vinci called "Codex Romanoff". Over time, the information in the book has been taken as fact by people, such as the claim that Da Vinci invented the napkin.
- Jonathan Routh's Initial Good Loo Guide: Where to "go" in London. London: Banyan, 1989. ISBN 0-7119-1282-3. Illustrated by Enzo Apicella, this paperback is considerably larger than the earlier work by Routh and Glashan. The odd title derives from the book's sponsorship by Initial Textile Services, a company that serviced loos.

== Filmography ==
Year	Title	Role
1967	Casino Royale	John
1968	30 Is a Dangerous Age, Cynthia	Captain Gore-Taylor
