= Dolf Kessler =

Dutch footballer and industrialist (1884–1945)

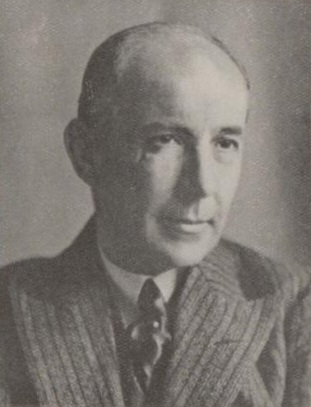

Personal information
- Full name: Geldolph Adriaan Kessler
- Date of birth: 2 April 1884
- Place of birth: Batavia, Dutch East Indies
- Date of death: 21 August 1945 (aged 61)
- Place of death: Velsen, Netherlands

Senior career*
Years	Team	Apps	(Gls)
- HVV Den Haag

International career
1905–1906	Netherlands	3	(0)
- * Club domestic league appearances and goals

Geldolph Adriaan "Dolf" Kessler (2 April 1884 – 21 August 1945) was a Dutch footballer and industrialist. Kessler – along with brother Boeli and cousins Tonny and Dé – played club football for amateur side HVV Den Haag. Kessler also won three caps for the Netherlands national side between 1905 and 1906.

== Family background ==
Kessler was born in a very wealthy family from The Hague, the oldest son of six children. His father Jean Baptiste August Kessler (1853–1900) was the first director of the Koninklijke Maatschappij tot exploitatie van Petroleumbronnen in Nederlandsch-Indië (K.N.M.E.P.) (Royal Dutch Society for the exploitation of Petroleumsources in the Dutch East-Indies), which would eventually turn into the Koninklijke Nederlandse Petroleum Maatschappij (Royal Dutch Petroleum Company), now named Royal Dutch Shell.

== Football career ==
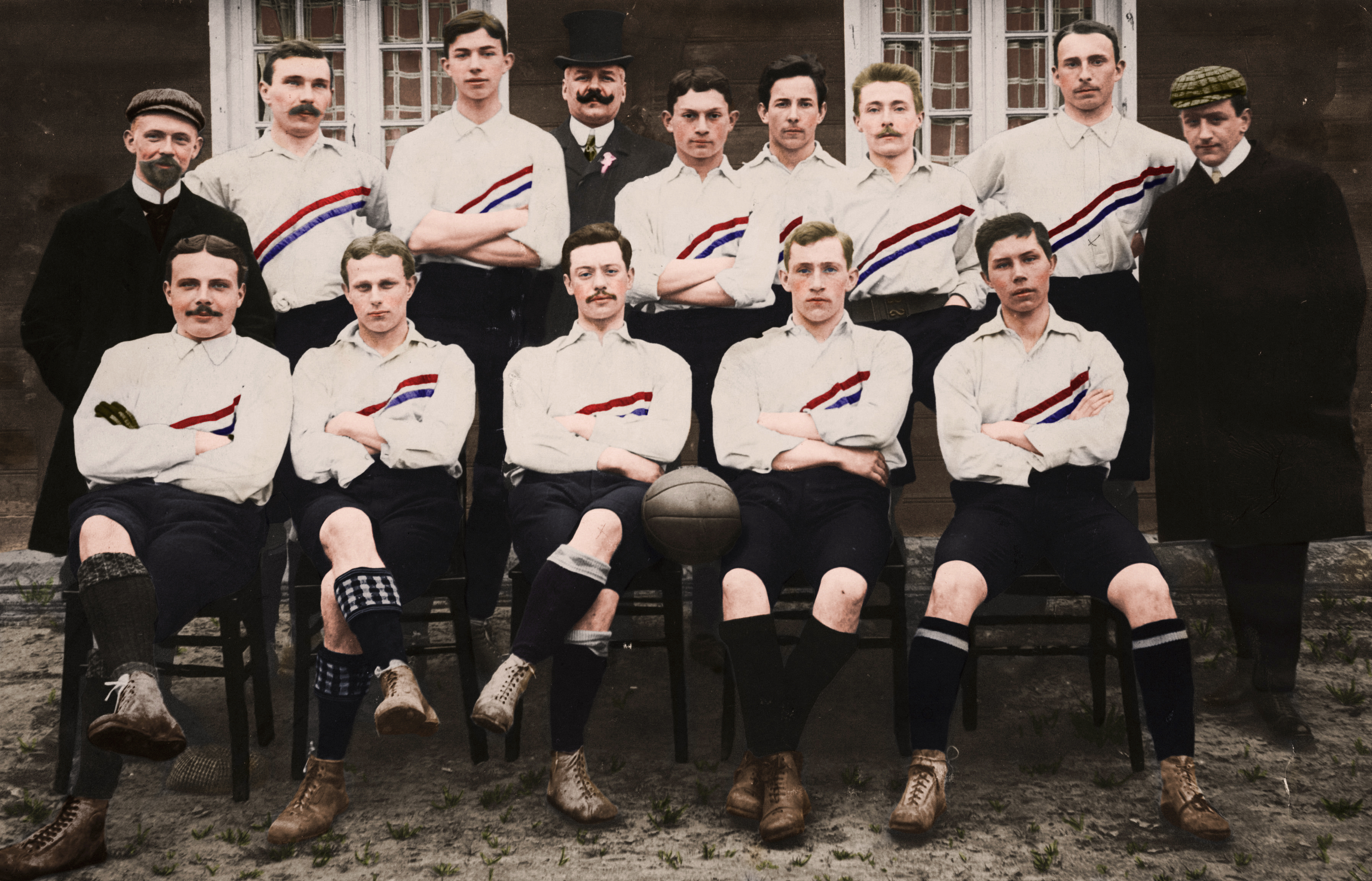
Kessler in Dutch national team (1905)

Dolf made his debut as a football player at seventeen years of age, at the Hague football club HVV. At first he stood leftback, later he was a right winger. At HVV he became national champion four times between 1901 and 1905. On 30 April 1905 he was captain during the first official international match of the Dutch national team. They beat Belgium with a 4–1 score. The second interland and first home match also saw Kessler leading the team. For his third and last interland in 1906 Dolf had passed the captaincy on to Kees Bekker. Kessler seriously considered a career in football until later that year he dislocated his knee, ending his career in football. Sports, however, remained important to him.

== Business career ==
In 1907 Kessler graduated from the Technische Hogeschool Delft (Delft University of Technology), as a mechanical engineer. He got a job as secretary for Henri Deterding, who had succeeded Dolf's father as the director of the Royal Dutch Petroleum Company. He worked for the company until 1915, when he left to look for a different job. As Joost Jonker and Jan Luiten van Zanden write in A History of the Royal Dutch Shell, his fiancée, Elizabeth "Bep" Stoop (herself a daughter of a prominent oil explorer, Adriaan Stoop), "put his love for her to the test by asking him to choose between her and the Group." His younger brother Jean Baptiste August "Guus" Kessler Jr., who had married Bep's cousin, Anna Francoise "Ans" Stoop, continued with the Royal Dutch and eventually rose to head their father's company.

In 1918 Dolf joined the committee for the funding of the Hoogovens (Dutch Blast Furnaces). In 1920 he became economical director and from 1924 on he was also the director-general. He was considered a very innovative manager, steering the company through the difficult economic environment of the Great Depression; he also believed it was necessary to provide fair wages and establish a pension plan—unusual for that time. "His drive, entrepreneurship, imagination and leadership secured Hoogovens a firm foothold in a very competitive industry at a very difficult time." Dolf and his brother Guus, as leading figures in two major Dutch business concerns, at one point formed a joint venture between the Hoogovens and Royal Dutch Shell to combat a perceived threat to the oil business by IG Farben.

Kessler would remain the director of Hoogovens until his death from a brain tumor in 1945, with a short break during the Second World War, when the Germans kept him hostage in camp Kamp Sint-Michielsgestel.

== Personal life ==
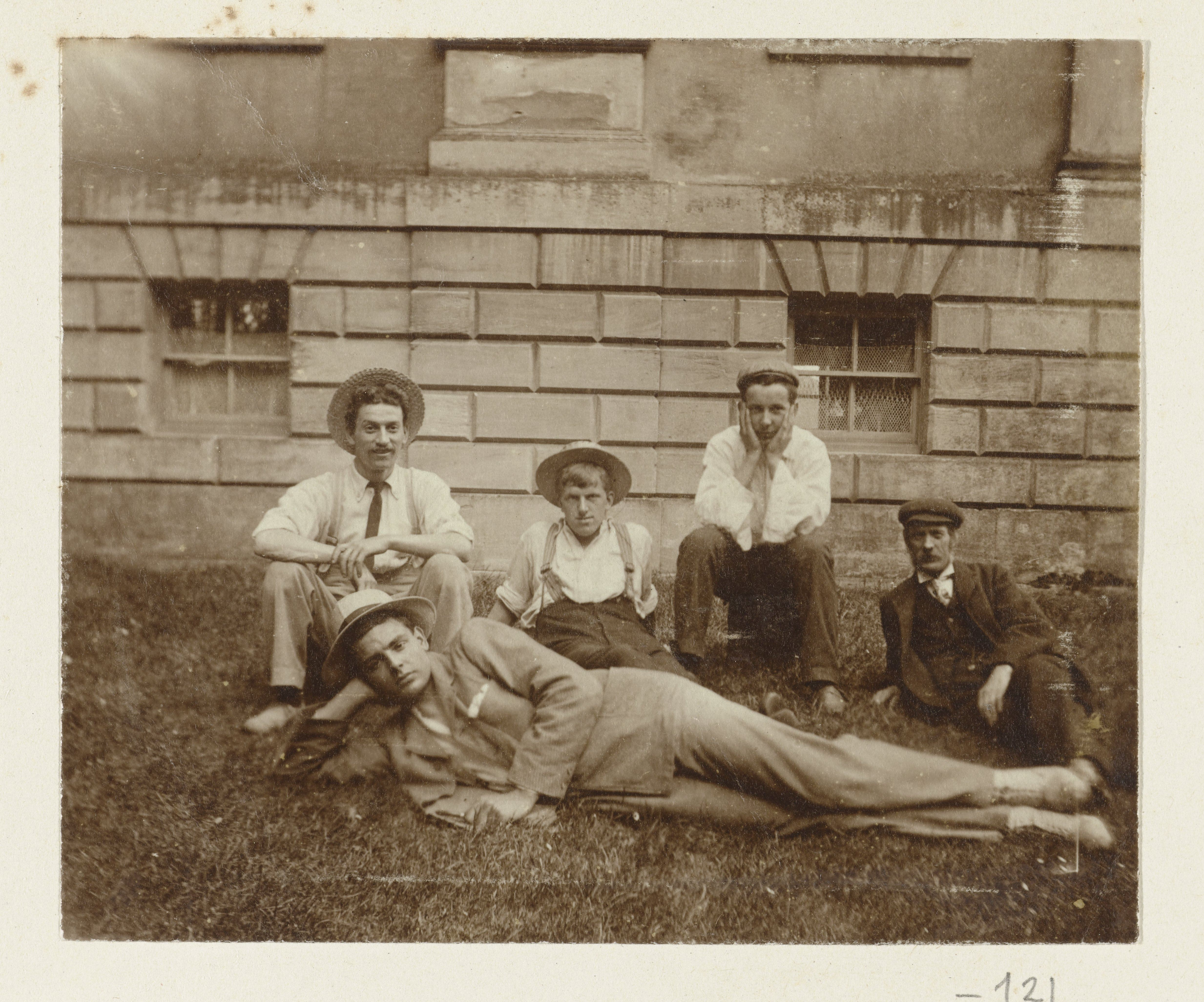

Dolf and his wife Bep (1891–1968) had four sons and two daughters. Their home, known as Slingerduin or the Villa Kessler, was built and designed in 1929 by the prominent Dutch architect Hendrik Wouda (1885–1946), a follower of Frank Lloyd Wright. They owned one of the few known paintings by Hercules Seghers (1589/90–1637/38)--"River Valley with Four Trees" (1620)--which now is displayed by the Mauritshuis Museum (Royal Picture Gallery) in The Hague.

Kessler was an uncle of the Dutch diplomat and historian Max Kohnstamm (1914–2010), with whom he was interned at camp Beekvliet in Sint-Michielsgestel; they became quite close there despite the difference in age. The American journalist Glenn Kessler is one of his grandchildren.

In 2016, the Rijksmuseum published, as part of its Studies in Photography series, "Around the World in 87 Photographs: Dolph Kessler's Grand Tour, 1908," by Mickey Hoyle. Kessler took photographs while traveling on business for Royal Dutch Shell with Deterding. His photographs, and the commentary he wrote to his mother, are described as an early example of a photographic travel journal, as very few people at that time were privileged to make such a journey.

== References and sources ==
=== Sources ===
- Zanden, Jan Luiten van; Jonker, Joost; Howarth, Stephen; Sluyterman, Keetie (2007). A History of Royal Dutch Shell. Oxford University Press. ISBN 978-0-19-929877-8.
- de Clercq, Daan; Saskia Everts; Michaja Langelaan; Ellen Stoop; Jet van Voorst Vader-Duyckinck Sander (2010). Uit Een Bron van Weelde: Het leven van de Erven Stoop [From a Source of Wealth: The Lives of the Stoop Heirs]. Stichting Stoop-van Deventer.
- De Vries, Joh. (1968). Hoogovens IJmuiden, 1918–1968.
- Buchanan, Brenda, ed. (2006). "Ernst Homburg: 'Explosives from Oil: The Transformation of Royal Dutch/Shell during World War I from Oil to Petrochemical Company'". Gunpowder, Explosives and the State: A Technological History. Ashgate Publishing Company. ISBN 978-0754652595.
- Gerretson, F.C. (1953). Geschiedenis der Koninklijke [History of the Royal Dutch]. E.J. Brill.
- Hoyle, Mickey (2016). Around the World in 87 Photographs: Dolph Kessler's Grand Tour, 1908. Rijksmuseum. ISBN 978-9491714634.
- Koch, Jeroen (2023). De Kesslers: Een familiegeschiedenis in olie en staal. Boom-Amsterdam. ISBN 978 90 2442 705 5.
- KESSLER, Geldolph Adriaan (1884–1945), Biographical Dictionary of the Netherlands
- "Kessler player profile". VoetbalStats.nl.

=== Publications ===
- E.M.L. Kessler-Stoop, Terugblick op het leven en de persoon van Geldolph Adriaan Kessler ("Looking back on the life and person of Geldolph Adriaan Kessler"), privately printed collection of letters, The Netherlands, 175 pages.
- Nicolette Kessler-Leemans and Beppe Kessler, Tussen Moeder en Zoon: Briefwisseling Margo Kessler-deLange en haar zoon Dolph, 1901–1938 ("Between Mother and Son: Correspondence from Margo Kessler-DeLange to her son Dolph"), privately printed collection of letters, The Netherlands, 423 pages, 2004.
- Janneke van Gool, G.A. Kessler: Innovatief ondernemerschap bij Hoogovens ("G.A. Kessler, Innovative Entrepreneurship at Hoogovens"), thesis for economic and social history, University of Nijmegen, 1998.
