= Alan Whicker =

British journalist and broadcaster (1921–2013)

Alan Whicker CBE
- Born: Donald Alan Whicker; 2 August 1921; Cairo, Egypt
- Died: 12 July 2013 (aged 91); Trinity, Jersey, Channel Islands
- Occupations: Journalist; Television presenter and broadcaster
- Partners: Olga Deterding (1966–1969); Valerie Kleeman (1969–2013; his death)

Donald Alan Whicker CBE (2 August 1921 – 12 July 2013) was a British journalist and television presenter and broadcaster. His career spanned almost 60 years, during which time he presented the documentary television programme Whicker's World for over 30 years. He was made a Commander of the Order of the British Empire (CBE) in 2005 for services to broadcasting.

== Early life ==
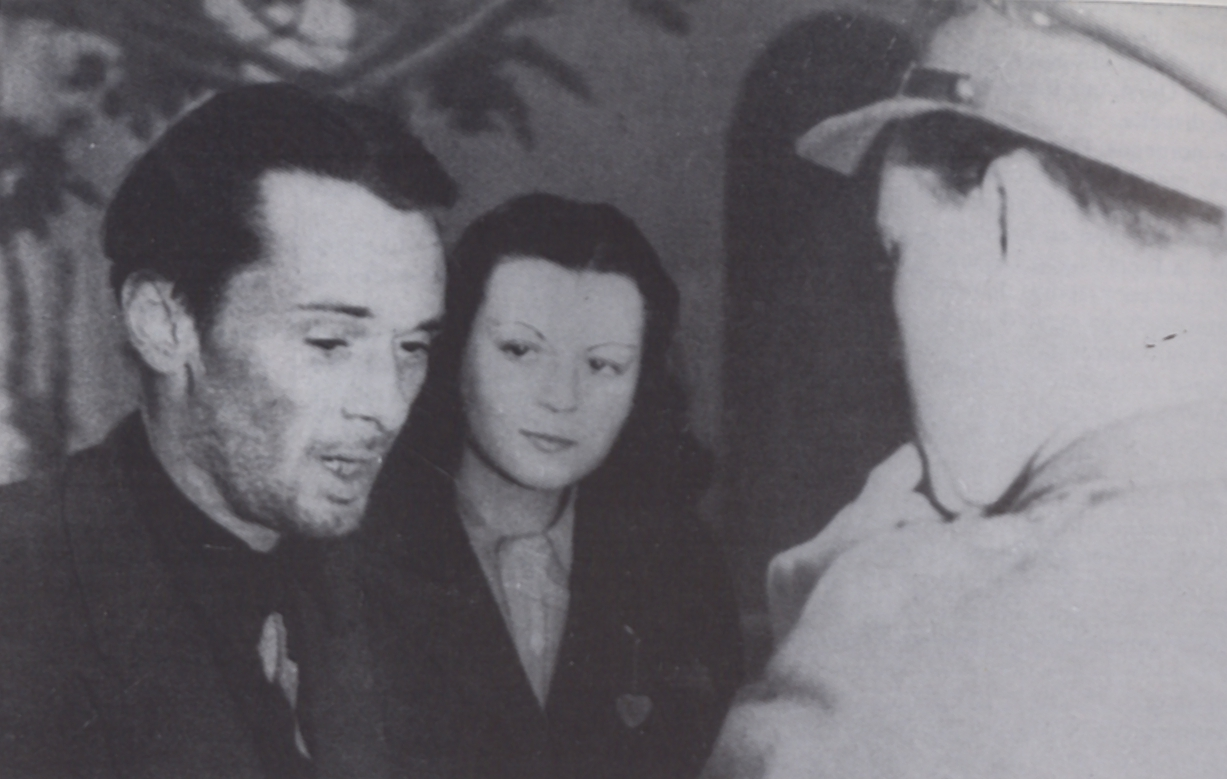
Whicker (right, with back to the camera) with John Amery shortly after the latter's arrest by Italian partisans in Milan

Whicker was born to British parents in Cairo, Egypt, in 1921. (Note: Sources such as Whicker's Who's Who entry give a year of birth of 1925.) When he was two years old his father Charles, a British Army officer, became seriously ill with a heart problem and died. The family, now consisting of his mother Nancy, Alan and his elder sister Mary, moved to Richmond in Surrey. His sister soon died, too. He attended Haberdashers' Aske's Boys School, an all-boys independent boarding school, where he excelled at cross-country running.

== Military service ==
During the Second World War he served in the British Army. He was commissioned as a second lieutenant in the Devonshire Regiment on 8 August 1942. He then joined the British Army's Army Film and Photographic Unit in Italy in 1943, filming at Anzio and meeting such influential figures as Field Marshal Bernard Montgomery. In March 1944, he was mentioned in despatches "in recognition of gallant and distinguished services in Sicily". He transferred to the Royal Army Ordnance Corps on 1 April 1945 with the war substantive rank of lieutenant.

In the documentary Whicker's War he revealed that he was one of the first in the Allied forces to enter Milan and that he took into custody an SS general and staff who were guarding the SS's paymaster's payroll money used to pay the SS troops, along with large amounts of cash in various foreign currencies, all contained within a large trunk. Whicker later handed over the SS men and the trunk of cash to the commander of an advancing US armoured column. While in Milan Whicker shot footage of the body of Benito Mussolini and was also responsible for taking into custody British traitor John Amery.

== Broadcasting career ==
After the war, Whicker became a journalist and broadcaster, acting as a newspaper correspondent during the Korean War. After joining the BBC in 1957, he became an international reporter for its Tonight programme. In 1958, he started presenting Whicker's World, which began life as a segment on the Tonight programme before becoming a fully-fledged series itself in the 1960s. Whicker's World was filmed all over the globe and became a huge ratings success in the UK. Whicker continued to present the series up until the 1990s, and he won a BAFTA Award in 1964 for his presentation in the Factual category; he also won the Richard Dimbleby Award at the 1978 BAFTA ceremony. Whicker was instrumental in launching Yorkshire Television (which made Whicker's World for some years), producing television programmes for it from 1969 until 1992. At the beginning of the ITV series, Whicker made Papa Doc – The Black Sheep (1969) on Haiti and its dictator François "Papa Doc" Duvalier who made himself available to Whicker and his team.

Whicker appeared in various adverts for American Express and Barclaycard, and was also the man behind the advertising slogan "Hello World", for travelocity. He narrated the 2007 and 2008 BBC documentary series Comedy Map of Britain.

In the 2005 New Year Honours Whicker was created a Commander of the Order of the British Empire for services to broadcasting. In 2009, then aged 88, Whicker returned to some of the locations and people who were originally featured in Whicker's World for the BBC series Alan Whicker's Journey of a Lifetime. In this, he met various people whom he had interviewed decades earlier to see how their lives had progressed or changed since the initial programme.

He was the subject of This Is Your Life in 1983 when he was surprised by Eamonn Andrews at the Berkeley Hotel in Kensington, London.

== Personal life ==
Whicker had a relationship with Olga Deterding from 1966 to 1969. He was with his partner, Valerie Kleeman (who was 25 years his junior), from 1969. He neither married nor had children.

=== Death ===
Whicker died from bronchial pneumonia at his home in Trinity, Jersey, in the Channel Islands, on 12 July 2013. He was 91. Broadcaster Michael Parkinson stated that Whicker was "a fine journalist and great storyteller", adding: "I can think of no other television reporter before or since who created such a wonderful catalogue of unforgettable programmes." Michael Palin said that Whicker was "a great character, a great traveller and an excellent reporter", while travel presenter Judith Chalmers said he was "an icon for the travel industry".

Most obituary writers said that Whicker was 87 at the time of his death, based on his entry in Who's Who giving a date of birth in 1925. The Financial Times pointed out that his age had been queried, with school records showing his birthdate in August 1921, making him 91 when he died.

In June 2015 it was announced that Whicker's estate would fund, through The Whickers, three annual awards totalling over £100,000 to be awarded to documentary makers, including funding and recognition prizes for audio documentaries.

== In popular culture ==
While presenting Whicker's World, Whicker was known for his subtle brand of satire and social commentary. Whicker's World was parodied in a Monty Python's Flying Circus sketch featuring a tropical island, "Whicker Island", where all the inhabitants dress and act like Whicker. Benny Hill, towards the end of his BBC series in 1968, impersonated Whicker in a parody called "Knicker's World".

He was parodied again in 1981 by the Evasions, a British funk group whose song, "Wikka Wrap", featured songwriter Graham de Wilde impersonating Whicker; the song was later sampled in American rapper Coolio's 1996 song "1, 2, 3, 4 (Sumpin' New)". De Wilde also composed the theme tune for the 1980s BBC episodes of Whicker's World.
