= John Glashan =

Scottish cartoonist (1927–1999)

John Glashan (born John McGlashan, 24 December 1927 – 15 June 1999) was a Scottish cartoonist, illustrator and playwright. He was the creator of the "Genius" cartoons.

Glashan's cartoons typically included small pen-and-ink figures drawn over a fabulous backdrop often featuring fantastic Gothic or imaginary architecture, surreal landscapes or gloriously impractical ingenious-looking machines.

== Life and work ==
Born in Glasgow and the son of the portrait painter Archibald A. McGlashan, John McGlashan studied painting at the Glasgow School of Art after national service in the army. He moved to London intending to make a living from painting portraits, but was unable to do so. After switching to cartooning and illustrating he shortened his surname to "Glashan".

Glashan's cartoons appeared in Lilliput, Queen, The Spectator, Punch, Private Eye, and various London newspapers, as well as Holiday and the New Yorker.

Glashan's illustrations were also used in advertising material for brands such as ICI, Aalders and Marchant, and Blue Nun.

A series of humorous guidebooks created with Jonathan Routh in the late 1960s allowed extensive expression of Glashan's graffiti-like style, combining small figures (often bearded men) with scrawled text – but, even here, often with elaborate backdrops.

The "Genius" cartoons, which allowed Glashan to use colour and a great expanse of space, ran in the Observer Magazine from 1978 to 1983, whereupon he concentrated on landscape painting. His cartoons reappeared from 1988 in the Spectator.

== Exhibitions ==
- Francis Kyle Gallery, 1979
- Francis Kyle Gallery, 1983
- The Cartoon Gallery, 1991
- The Fine Arts Society, 1991
- The Fine Arts Society, 1994

== Publications ==
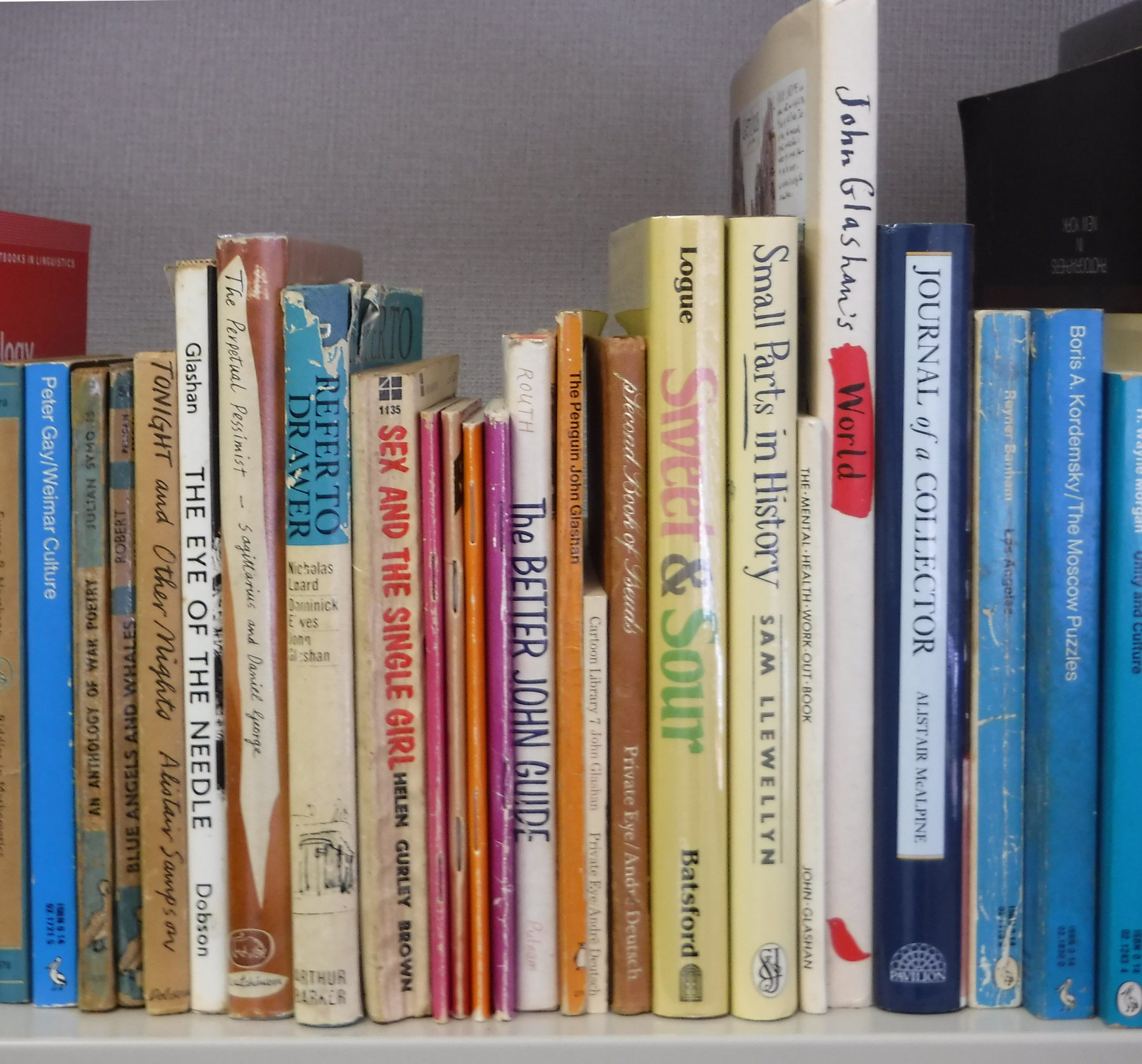
Books by, or with illustrations by, John Glashan (flanked by irrelevant Pelicans)

=== Books ===
- The Eye of the Needle. London: Dennis Dobson, 1961. A hardback of about eighty (unnumbered) pages. Some stories spread over as many as seven pages; many others are just single frames. Glashan's style already seems fully formed: little bearded men (by themselves, in small groups, or even in their thousands) are rendered even smaller by lovingly drawn but oppressive neo-renaissance or rococo backdrops. In the inner rear flap, we are told that Glashan was previously a brain surgeon. Much, perhaps all of the content of the book had previously appeared in Lilliput (a fact that goes unmentioned).
- Speak Up You Tiny Fool. New York: Dial, 1966. A hardback of about ninety (unnumbered) pages, in a larger format than The Eye of the Needle and duplicating much of the content of the earlier book, with additions. Jules Feiffer provides an introduction.
- The Penguin John Glashan. Harmondsworth, Middx: Penguin, 1967. A paperback of about a hundred (unnumbered) pages, duplicating much of Speak Up You Tiny Fool.
- Private Eye Cartoon Library 7: The Jokes of John Glashan. London: Private Eye & André Deutsch, 1975. ISBN 0-233-96723-0 (On the front cover: "Private Eye Cartoon Library 7 / John Glashan / The Meths Festival and Other Celebrations".) Contains about one hundred (unnumbered) pages of cartoons, of which most were drawn from the book rather than reproduced from Private Eye (or so the copyright page informs us). Perhaps three quarters of the book is devoted to "The Meths Festival and other celebrations", a story about what transpires during one annual festival held in "the sleepy pig iron town of Grinding Mallet", a grim place whose every brick is lovingly delineated. While the Head Methner of the Meth Chateau shows around an appreciative group of Japanese businessmen, festival-goer Filbert learns to walk with his head tilted to one side.
- The Mental Health Work-Out Book: An Account of the Darren Whitlow Technique. London: Crystal Clear, 1986. ISBN 0-948453-42-7. "Researched" (written and illustrated) by Glashan. On the back cover: "This volume shows how you too can build a Powerful Brain and enjoy the Benefits of Radiant Mental Health."
- John Glashan's World. London: Robinson, 1991. ISBN 1-85487-104-8. An anthology of Glashan's work.

=== Illustrations in other people's books ===
- Tonight and Other Nights. By Alistair Sampson. London: Dennis Dobson, 1959.
- The Perpetual Pessimist: An Everlasting Calendar of Gloom and Almanac of Woe. By Sagittarius and Daniel George. London: Hutchinson, 1963.
- Refer to Drawer. By Nicholas Luard and Dominick Elwes. London: Arthur Barker, 1964.
- Sex and the Single Girl. By Helen Gurley Brown. London: Four Square, 1964. (This edition has "£ove $tory", an unpaginated 32-page supplement by Glashan, between pages 128 and 129.)
- The Good Loo Guide: Where to Go in London. By Jonathan Routh with Brigid Segrave. London: Wolfe, 1965. Second (expanded) edition: Wolfe, 1968.
- Good Cuppa Guide: Where to Have Tea in London. By Jonathan Routh. London: Wolfe, 1966.
- Guide Porcelaine to the Loos of Paris. By Jonathan Routh. London: Wolfe, 1966. French translation: Guide Porcelaine des "lieux" de Paris (Editions de la Jeune Parque, 1967).
- The Better John Guide: Where to Go in New York. By Jonathan Routh with Serena Stewart. New York: Putnam, 1966
- Private Eye's pSecond Book of Pseuds. Ed. Richard Ingrams. London: Private Eye, André Deutsch, 1977. ISBN 0-233-96945-4
- Sweet and Sour: An Anthology of Comic Verse. Ed. Christopher Logue. London: Batsford, 1983. ISBN 0-7134-3792-8
- Small Parts in History. By Sam Llewellyn. London: Sidgwick & Jackson, 1985. ISBN 0-283-99219-0
- Journal of a Collector. By Alistair McAlpine. London: Pavilion, 1994. ISBN 1-85793-433-4

=== Partial list of anthologies including cartoons ===
- The Best of Private Eye. London: Private Eye, André Deutsch, 1976. ISBN 0-233-96827-X.
- 30 Years of Private Eye Cartoons, ed. Ian Hislop. London: Private Eye & Corgi, 1991. ISBN 0-552-13859-2 (paper), ISBN 0-552-13862-2 (hard)

=== Partial list of plays ===
- "Balance Wheel: A play in one act." In About Town, August 1962.
