= Boelie Kessler =

Dutch footballer (1896–1971)

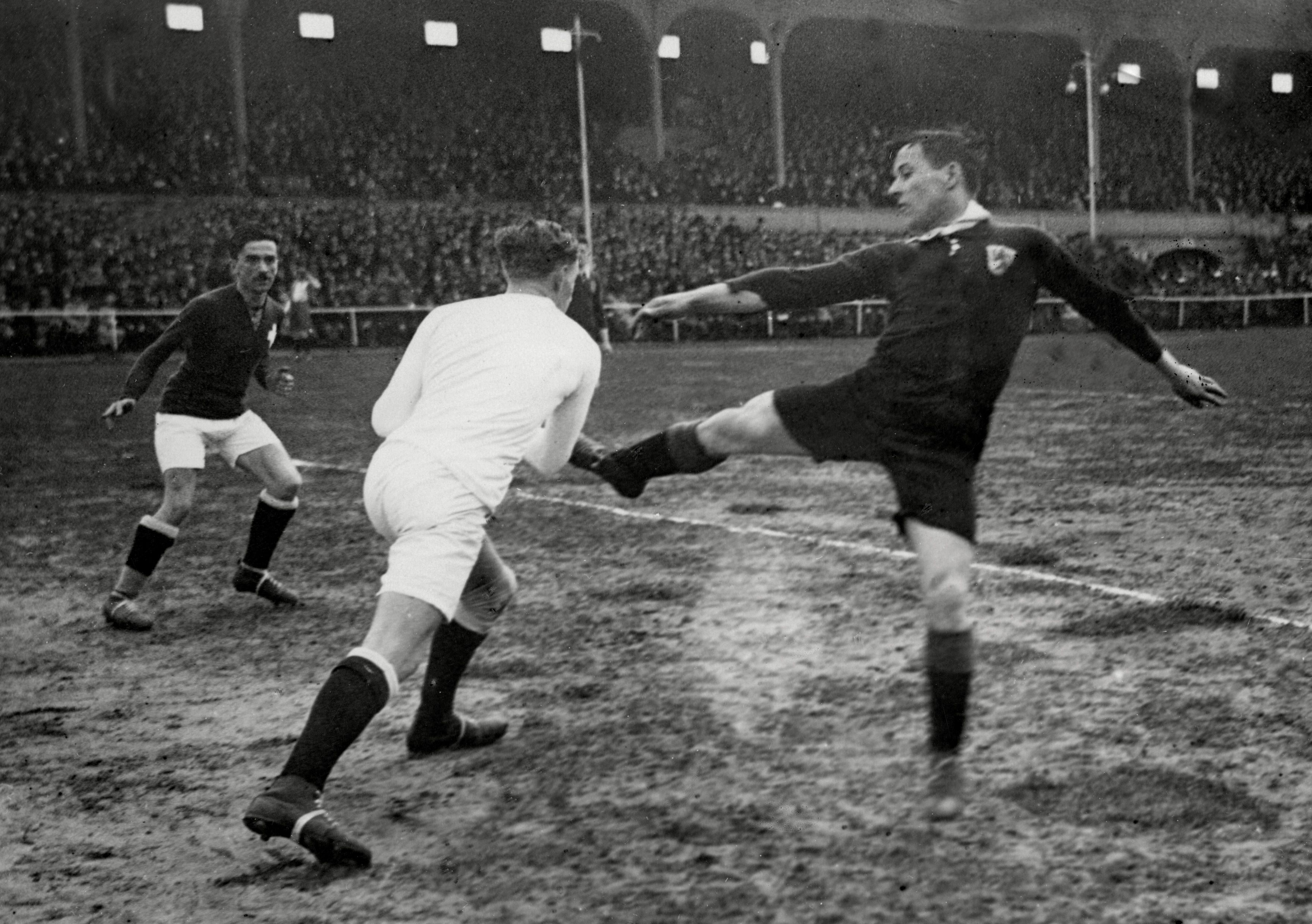
- Kessler (right) in 1921

Personal information
- Full name: Hermann Johannes Kessler
- Date of birth: 30 November 1896
- Place of birth: The Hague, Netherlands
- Date of death: 17 August 1971 (aged 74)
- Place of death: Netherlands
- Position: Forward

Senior career*
Years	Team	Apps	(Gls)
- HVV Den Haag

International career
1919–1922	Netherlands	9	(2)
- * Club domestic league appearances and goals

Hermann Johannes "Boelie" Kessler (30 November 1896 – 17 August 1971) was a Dutch footballer who played as a forward. Along with brother Dolf and cousins Tonny and Dé he played club football for amateur side HVV Den Haag. Kessler also won nine caps for the Netherlands national side between 1919 and 1922, scoring two goals. He was the youngest son of Dutch oil entrepreneur Jean Baptiste August Kessler.
