= Olga Deterding =

Heiress and socialite (1926–1978)

Olga Maria Deterding (23 August 1926 – 31 December 1978) was a wealthy heiress and socialite who regularly featured in the gossip columns of London society during the 1960s and 1970s.

She inherited an estimated £50,000,000 from her father Sir Henri Deterding, the second chief executive of Royal Dutch Petroleum, following his death in 1939 (equivalent to £2.83 billion in 2025). Her mother was Deterding's second wife, the White Russian Lydia Pavlovna Koudoyaroff (1904–80), a former mistress of his rival Calouste Gulbenkian. Olga Deterding grew up at Buckhurst Park at Winkfield in Berkshire and was later educated at Oxford University. In 1956, she became an unpaid volunteer at Albert Schweitzer's leper colony in Lambarene, West Africa.

Without any medical training, she worked in the kitchen and at other tasks but refused to see even visitors she knew. Deterding remained with Schweitzer for a year until she became ill with a tropical disease. After this, she lived in Tahiti for six months. In Beirut, a city she apparently disliked, Deterding found that a flight to Paris was a week away, but the option of flying around the world to reach Paris meant that she could leave at once. Deterding arrived back in Paris later than if she waited the week in Beirut.

From 1966-69, she had a relationship with broadcaster Alan Whicker, with whom she was for a time engaged, and made Whicker her heir in a will (later changed). By now, subject to mood swings, she was suffering from bulimia and an addiction to tranquillisers. Shortly after attempting suicide in Whicker's flat, she suddenly left.

Later she became involved with Jonathan Routh; their relationship lasted for several years from 1971. Jennifer Paterson, later one of the Two Fat Ladies, had by then become a close friend. She suggested that the two women might live together and become "the most famous lesbian couple in London."

In 1976, Deterding put in an unsuccessful bid to buy The Observer newspaper, then in a serious financial predicament. Deterding was an eccentric partygoer and died in a nightclub on New Year's Eve after choking on her food. A subsequent coroner's inquest was told, "Miss Deterding ate lasagne, roast beef, rice and beans." According to pathologist Peter Lantos, a large (3 x 3½-inch) piece of beef was found in her throat, and she had an exceptionally high blood-alcohol level. The coroner, Gavin Thurston, recorded a verdict of accidental death due to asphyxia.
