= Telega Tunggal No 1 =

First successful oil well drilled in Indonesia

Telega Tunggal No 1 was the first successful oil well in Indonesia, drilled in 1885 in Sumatra. The area where the drilling occurred was known as the Telega Said concession area.

The drilling in Sumatra had begun earlier and Telega Tiga is usually cited as the first exploratory well in 1883.

The development of the Telega oilfield was intricately linked to the founding and development of the earlier part of the Shell oil company in the nineteenth century, the Royal Dutch Petroleum Company. The original mover of the company behind the development of the oil concession, Aeilko Jans Zijlker died from a tropical disease in 1890 was succeeded by Jean Baptiste August Kessler who lived only another 10 years himself.

The Telega Said oil wells had dried up by 1900.

== See also ==
- Jean Baptiste August Kessler
