= Frank Stoop =

Cornelis François Stoop (13 October 1863 – 7 November 1933), also known as Cornelius Frank Stoop, was a Dutch-born stockbroker and art collector based in London.

Stoop was born in Dordrecht to Adriaan Stoop and Cornelia Deking Dura. His elder brother was Frederick Cornelis Stoop CBE (1854–1933). Cornelis moved to London in the 1880s.

Through his generosity and connections with the Tate Gallery, the gallery received an oil painting by Georges Braque, a number of drawings and sculptures by Henri Gaudier-Brzeska and a further major donation in 1933 after his death of 17 works by modern European artists, including two paintings by Paul Cézanne, the unfinished painting Farms near Auvers (1890) by Van Gogh, pastels by Degas and the first paintings by Picasso to enter the British national collection at Tate.

Stoop died at his home in Islington after a short illness. He also had a home at 9 Hans Place, London, SW1.
