= Adrian Stoop =

English rugby union player

Adrian Dura Stoop
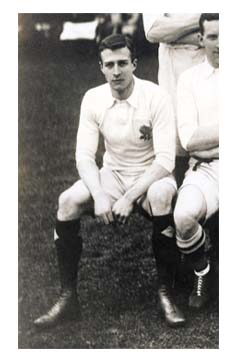
- Born: Adrian Dura Stoop; 27 March 1883 Kensington, England
- Died: 27 November 1957 (aged 74) Aldershot, England
- School: Dover College; Rugby School
- University: University of Oxford
- Military career
- Allegiance: United Kingdom
- Branch: British Army
- Rank: Captain
- Unit: Queen's Royal Regiment (West Surrey)
- Awards: Military Cross
- Notable relative: Adriaan Stoop (uncle)

Rugby union career
- Position: Fly-half
Senior career
Years	Team	Apps	(Points)
- Oxford University RFC
–	Harlequin F.C.		
–	Barbarian F.C.		
International career
Years	Team	Apps	(Points)
1905-1912	England	15	(6)

Adrian Stoop (27 March 1883 – 27 November 1957) was an English rugby union player of Dutch descent.

He played 182 times for Harlequins between 1901 and 1939, and won 15 caps for England.

He was president of the Harlequins 1920–1949. The club's ground, The Stoop, is named in his memory.

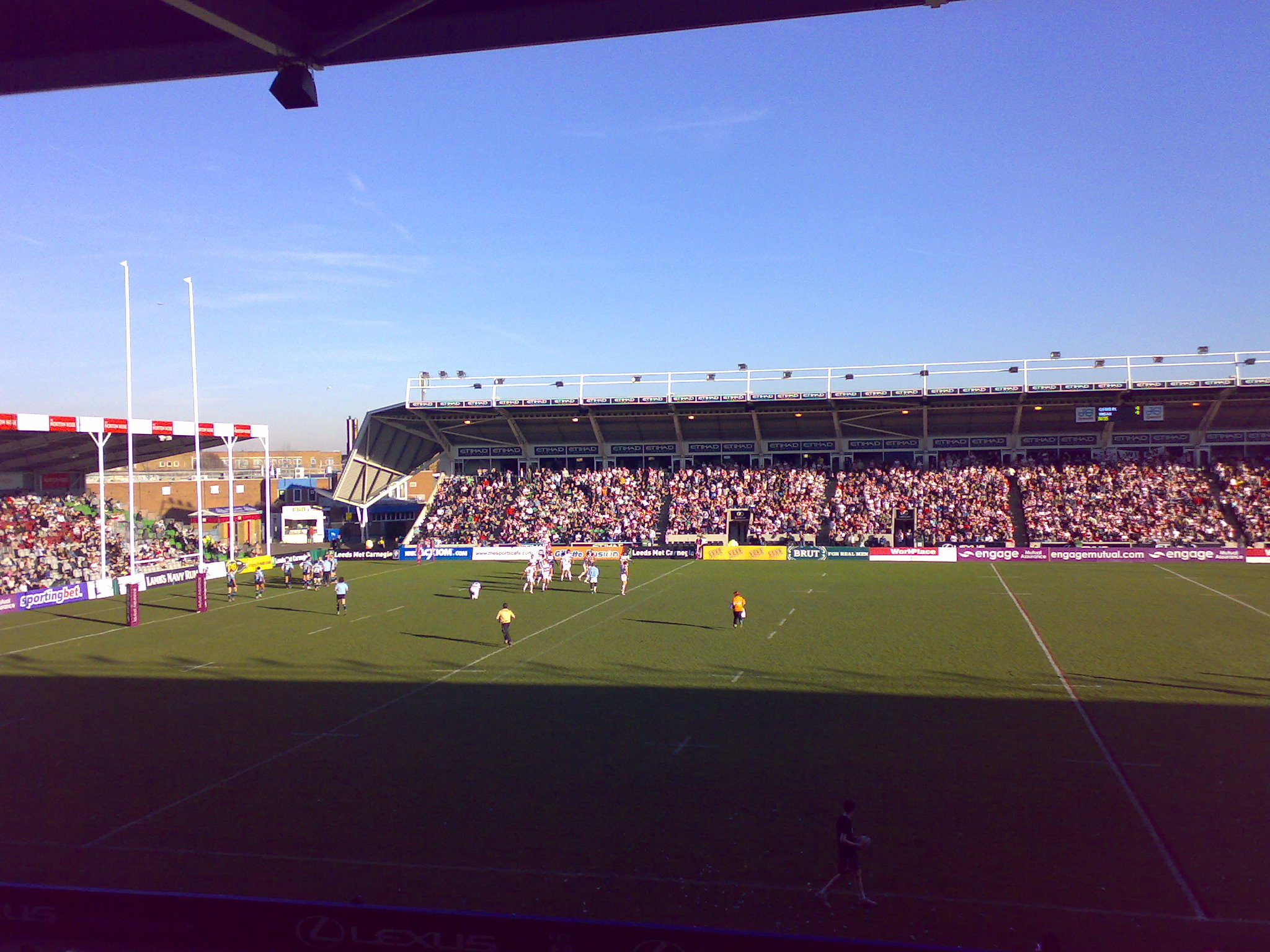
The Stoop, his name given to the ground

His association with Harlequins lasted from his debut against Oxford University in November 1901 until 1950 when he ended his 30-year stint as president of the club. He played his last game in Quins colours in 1939, at the age of 56. He made 182 appearances in total, captained the side 143 times and scored 86 tries, being club captain for 8 consecutive seasons from 1906/07 to 1913/14.

Stoop was born on 27 March 1883 in Cromwell Road, London. His father was Dutch and his mother was half Scottish/half Irish. He went to Dover College in 1896 and on to Rugby School in 1898, where he played for the school team, and then to Oxford University, where he was captain of the rugby team in 1904.

It was whilst he was still at Rugby school that he was asked to join Harlequins. He had also been approached by Blackheath, who at the time were a bigger name than Quins, but he decided to accept the offer from Quins.

In 1905, Stoop made his debut for England against Scotland and it was also against Scotland that he earned the last of his 15 caps in 1912. During this time he captained the national side twice, including the first ever international played at Twickenham in 1910. Had it not been for a broken collarbone in 1907 he would have added to his international appearances.

Stoop is widely credited with revolutionising back play. Previously, the two half backs were designated as "left and right", but Stoop incorporated ideas already being used in Wales and New Zealand to introduce the concept of the Scrum Half and Fly Half. He used these ideas to great success for both Harlequins and England.

As well as being club captain from 1906 to 1914, Stoop was secretary from 1905 to 1914 and from 1920 to 1938 as well as president from 1920 to 1950. He was also president of the RFU in 1932 and was a member of the selection committee. In addition to Quins and England he also represented Oxford University, Surrey and The Barbarians.

He was keen beekeeper and ornithologist.

He died on 27 November 1957, aged 74. He is buried at Hartley Wintney, Hampshire, where he had lived for many years.
