= Adriaan Stoop =

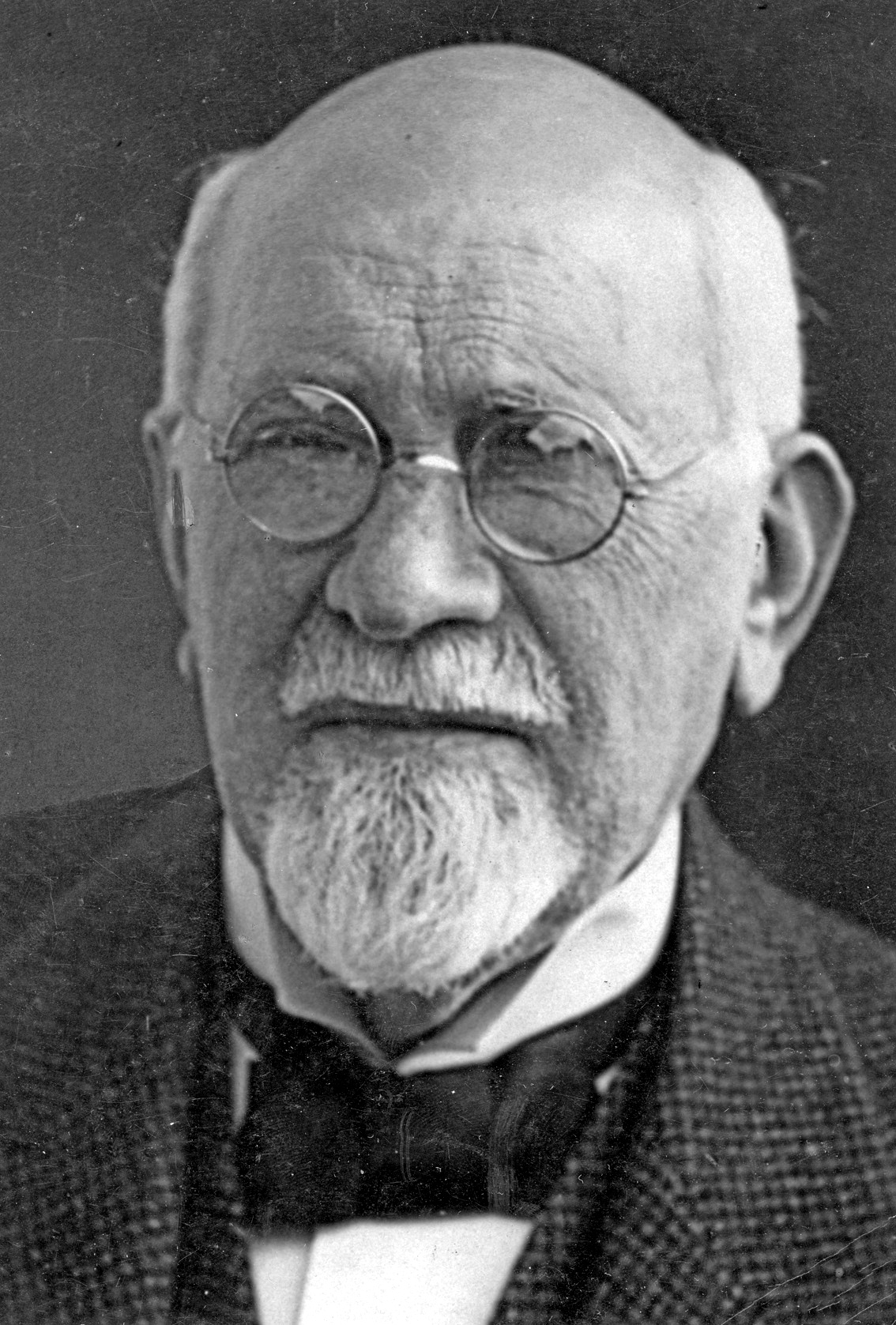
- Stoop in 1931
- Born: 18 October 1856; Dordrecht, Netherlands
- Died: 7 September 1935 (aged 78); Bloemendaal, Netherlands
- Education: Delft University
- Occupations: Mining engineer, oil prospector
- Spouse: Wilhelmina Bernardina van Deventer (m. 1880)
- Parents: Adriaan Stoop (father); Cornelia Deking Dura (mother)
- Relatives: Dolf Kessler (son-in-law); Adrian Dura Stoop (nephew)
- Awards: Knight of the Order of the Netherlands Lion

Adriaan Stoop (18 October 1856 – 7 September 1935) was a Dutch oil prospector and mining engineer.

== Life and career ==
Stoop was born in Dordrecht. He graduated from Delft University with a mining degree in 1878, was posted to the Department of Mines and arrived in the Dutch East Indies. Realizing he knew little about oil prospecting, Stoop requested paid leave for a study trip to the United States. Although the American oil industry, afraid of new competition in Asia, refused to see him, Stoop was still able to collect essential new information on the latest American drilling techniques. His report became the "bible" for oil drilling technology in the Dutch East Indies. Stoop proposed that the Dutch colonial government should start a state petroleum enterprise, but the idea was rejected. Stoop then requested three years leave of absence so he could initiate oil exploration at his own risk. Stoop "was a man above average, a forceful personality in a delicate frame; able, matter-of-fact and self-disciplined; a silent man, his mind only revealed itself in sparks of keen humor."

Stoop acquired one of the first oil concessions in Indonesia in 1886 and with money from friends and family in 1887—as Gerretson puts it, 50,000 Dutch guilders "from head-shaking relatives"—he founded the Dordtsche Petroleum Maatschappij. Within a year, he had a "spouter." Production increased steadily and he had a ready home market on the island of Java. He introduced gasoline street lighting to several large cities on Java in the 1890s. "If the Royal Dutch relied upon distribution for its strength, the Dordtsche excelled in manufacture." In 1896, Stoop returned to the Netherlands and sold shares in the company to the public, becoming very wealthy. He had held all 350 shares in the company, and converted each into 14,900 guilders in cash and 20,000 guilders in ordinary shares. Thus he yielded more than 5 million guilders in cash and 7 million guilders in shares from the initial investment just ten years earlier.

However, in order to stay competitive the company would have needed to expand its sales territory beyond Java and this would have required an enormous investment in ships and unloading supplies. By 1910, the Dordtsche was the last independent producer on Java and rumors spread that Royal Dutch Shell's main rival, Standard Oil, would buy it. But in the end Stoop merged his enterprise with the Royal Dutch Shell through an exchange of stock in 1911. Dordtsche Petroleum Maatschappij board minutes later revealed company officials feared a "public outcry" if they did not sell to another Dutch company. The board expected “a storm against us, if the competition struggle would end in the favor of the foreigner [Standard Oil],” the minutes said.

While prospecting for oil in Bavaria, Germany in the early 1900s, Stoop discovered instead thermal water containing high levels of sulfur and iodine. German specialists thought this water would have health promoting properties and this led to creation of a spa at Bad Wiessee that exists to this day. Stoop also built his vacation home Jungbrunnen there.
