= Jean Baptiste August Kessler =

Dutch entrepreneur and oil explorer

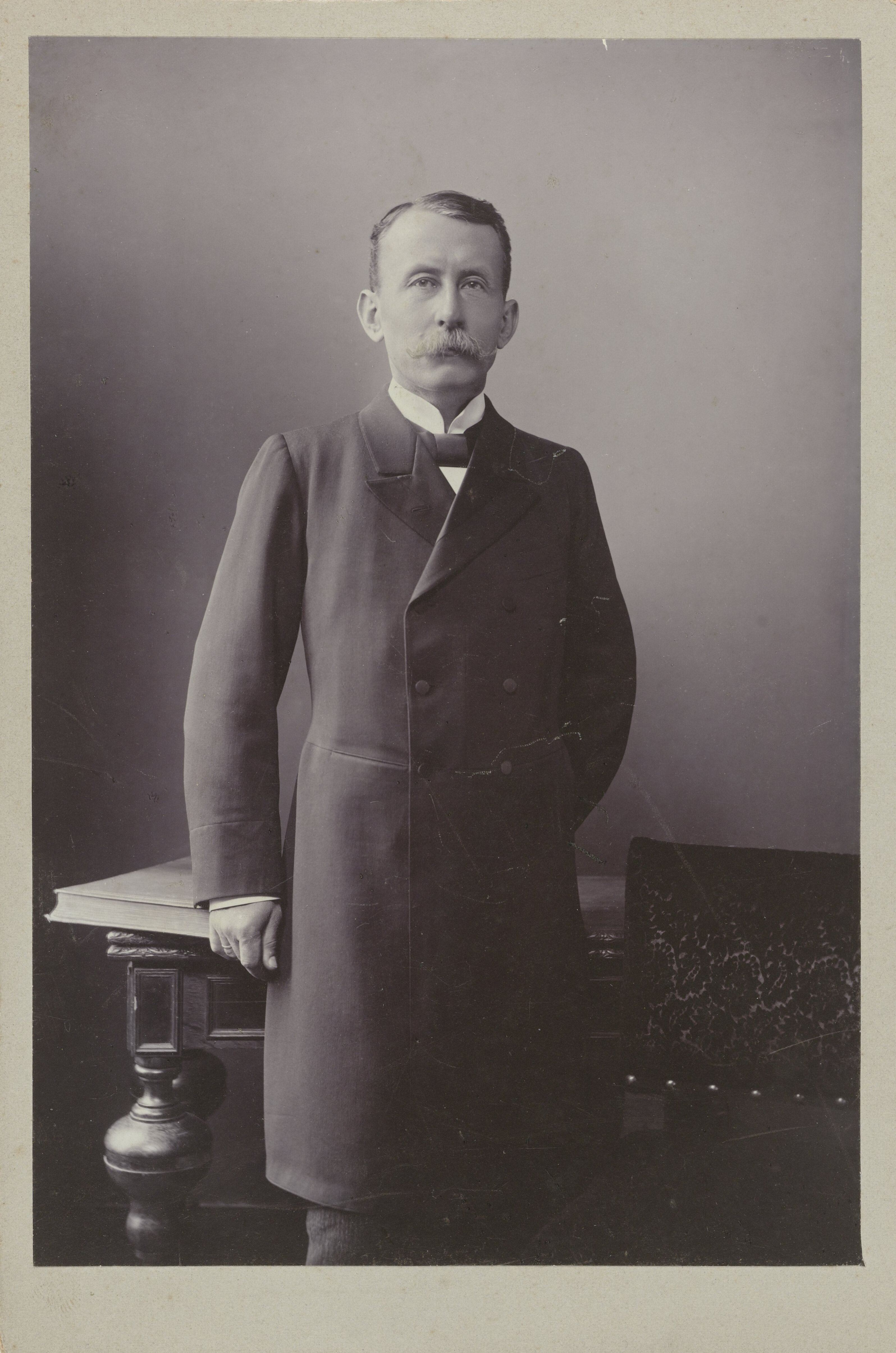
- Born: 15 December 1853; Batavia, Dutch East Indies
- Died: 14 December 1900 (aged 46); Naples, Italy
- Occupations: oil entrepreneur and chief executive, Royal Dutch Petroleum
- Spouse: M.J.J. (Margo) Kessler-De Lange

Jean Baptiste August Kessler (15 December 1853 – 14 December 1900) was a Dutch entrepreneur and oil explorer who was largely responsible for the growth and development of the Royal Dutch Petroleum Co., now part of present-day Shell.

== Early life and career ==
Kessler, who was known by his middle name August, was born 15 December 1853 in Batavia, Dutch East Indies (now Jakarta, Indonesia). There were 12 children in the family, four of whom died in infancy.

Kessler became managing director of the Royal Dutch nearly from its inception. Aeilko Jans Zijlker acquired the original oil concession in Indonesia and the "Royal" imprimatur but died suddenly of a tropical disease in 1890. The board of directors turned to Kessler, who was a son-in-law of Geldolph Adriaan De Lange, one of the directors, to head a committee of inquiry into whether the faltering enterprise was still viable. He took the post with the understanding he would be made managing director and run the company. Kessler had vast experience in the Dutch East Indies, having abandoned his studies at the Delft University at the age of 23 to seek his fortune there. He had become partner in Tiedeman & Van Kerchem, an important business firm, but after financial difficulties in 1888 "returned broken and shattered in health to Europe, where he sought and found recovery". He was described as someone who was old for his age but possessed personal leadership and an unflagging stamina.

== Builder of the Royal Dutch Petroleum Company ==
Kessler built the Royal Dutch almost from scratch, under very difficult circumstances: "an inclement climate, a hostile jungle and ineradicable lalang (sharp, tough grass), local crews difficult to manage, equipment that did not fit, tropical diseases, operational set-backs such as fires, and absence of adequate geological know-how", wrote J. Ph. Poley in Eroica: The Quest for Oil in Indonesia (1850-1898). "There were also financial, regulatory and procedual hurdles to overcome...The Company survived mainly thanks to the turn-around effected by Jean Baptiste August Kessler."

As Anthony Sampson put it, the company's origins belonged "to the world of Joseph Conrad rather than Anthony Trollope." When Kessler arrived in Sumatra in October 1891, after a two-month sea voyage, he found that the works manager had disappeared in a huff. He discovered that the drilling site was in terrible shape, with essential supplies disappearing or strewn about in the constantly approaching jungle. But he plunged into his work with enormous energy. Due to his ability to quickly solve all kinds of technical problems and his incredible energy, he was accepted by his subordinates as "Toean Besor"—the Big Boss—not withstanding what many would describe as a difficult, high-strung personality.

Daniel Yergin, in his history of oil The Prize: The Epic Quest for Oil, Money, and Power wrote that "more than any other man", Kessler was responsible for the survival of the Royal Dutch. He said that "Kessler was a born leader, with an iron will, and with the ability to concentrate all his own energy and that of those around him on a single objective."

Quoting from Kessler's letters to his wife, Yergin illustrates the obstacles faced by the daring oil explorer: "Half-heartedness, ignorance, indifference, dilapidation, disorder, and vexation are everywhere apparent," Kessler reported. "If things go wrong, my job and my name are gone and perhaps my sacrifices and my extraordinary exertions will be repaid with censure in the bargain. Heaven preserve me from all that misery."

In constant rain, Kessler attempted to connect the drilling site and refinery with a pipeline. Steamkettles were transported through a jungle path on rails, which were removed after the kettles had been pulled up in order to be used for the next stretch. A storm interrupted the supply of rice, resulting in severe food shortages. The drilling produced barely any oil.

Kessler, suffering from a fever, worked day and night and was everywhere with improvisations, giving instructions and managing the overall operation. With the greatest difficulty, Kessler and his team were able to get the supplies for a second tower. This one was a "spouter" and on 28 February 1892, the first oil flowed through the new pipe to the refinery. The Dutch flag was raised.

Kessler returned to the Netherlands, nearly nine months after his "inspection trip" began, and focused on trying to secure the necessary capital for the still shaky enterprise. But within two years, oil production had dramatically declined, the new on-site works manager had quit and the company was nearly bankrupt. Kessler again returned to Sumatra to save the infant company. With a small group of workers--"I demand the nearly impossible but there is no choice; everything rests on my shoulders"—Kessler again managed to turn things around and tripled oil production within a year. He stayed in Indonesia until 1895, before returning to the Netherlands to focus on the commercial end of the business.

Under Kessler, the company relaunched its principal product under the brand name "Crown Oil", expanded refining capacity, built a fleet of tankers and constructed several tank farms. In 1897, Royal Dutch increased its capital to 5 million guilders (in 1890, the nominal capital had been 1.3 million guilders) and paid a dividend of 52 percent. He also started nascent joint venture talks with Marcus Samuel, an important trader in oil products based in London under the "Shell" name, but a merger did not take place until 1907, with Royal Dutch taking a dominant role by owning 60 percent of the new holding company. Even mighty Standard Oil began to get concerned about the new rival in the business.

Dr. F.C. Gerretson, in his four-volume History of the Royal Dutch, heaped praise on Kessler, describing his leadership as necessary for the building of one of the world's major companies: "He was high-strung and passionate, forceful and impervious, a man of strong prepossessions and often difficult to get along with. He was a born leader of men. Few knew so well how to concentrate all available resources upon a single purpose; how to inspire their fellow workers with their own enthusiasm and energy. Few were capable of such absolute devotion to the task once it has been undertaken".

Another book, Joost Jonker's and Jan Luiten van Zanden's A History of Royal Dutch Shell, lauds Kessler's "unbelievable capacity for hard work...Kessler's sometimes strained behavior emanated from the inner tension between his formal training as a gentleman and his leadership drive, from the necessity to sustain polite discussion whilst craving to go into action". Kessler was a novice at oil and did not have much technical training, but "quickly developed a remarkable, intuitive grasp of the industry in all its aspects, founded on his keen sense for figures".

== Unexpected death ==
The hard work amid difficult surroundings led to Kessler's death one day shy of his 47th birthday. In 1898, oil production in the overworked oil field dropped precipitously. Kessler managed to get a concession for a new oil field from the local Sumatran king and in 1900 he went back to Dutch East Indies one last time. When he arrived he was sick and after only a few days he telegraphed the head office in The Hague that he needed to recuperate and would take the next boat back. He died from a heart attack when his ship made port in Naples, the first stop after the Suez Canal.

Kessler, according to Jonker and van Zanten, was "really Royal Dutch's founding father, the man who created the business and sustained it against the odds, perhaps even against economic common sense. His absolute firmness of purpose had built solid foundations" before his untimely death from exhaustion in the effort to create the nascent company.

Gerretson summed up: "It was Kessler's audacity, Kessler's faith, and Kessler's indomitable pertinacity in the hour of trial which brought the Company to where it stood when it lost him".

== Aftermath ==
After his death, he was succeeded by a man he had hired as his deputy, Henri Deterding, in 1901. Deterding would later declare, "As a pioneer in oil, the part played by J.B. August Kessler stands second to none."

August and his wife Margo had four sons and two daughters. One of their sons, Jean Baptiste August "Guus" Kessler Jr., eventually became director-general of Royal Dutch Shell after Deterding resigned in 1936; he also played tennis for the Netherlands in the 1906 Olympics in Athens. Their oldest son, Geldolph Adriaan Kessler, also worked for the Royal Dutch before he left to help form and run the Hoogovens, the Dutch steel company. Dolf Kessler and his brother Boelie Kessler played football for the Dutch national team.

== See also ==
- Telega Tunggal No 1

== References and sources ==
=== Sources ===
- Poley, J. Ph. (2000). Eroica: The Quest for Oil in Indonesia (1850-1898). Kluwer Academic Publishers. ISBN 0-7923-6222-5.
- Gerretson, F.C. (1953). Geschiedenis der Koninklijke [History of the Royal Dutch]. E.J. Brill.
- Zanden, Jan Luiten van; Jonker, Joost; Howarth, Stephen; Sluyterman, Keetie (2007). A History of Royal Dutch Shell. Oxford University Press. ISBN 978-0-19-929877-8.
- Yergin, Daniel (1991). The Prize: The Epic Quest for Oil, Money, and Power. Simon & Schuster. ISBN 0-671-50248-4.
- Sampson, Anthony (1975). The Seven Sisters: The Great Oil Companies and the World They Shaped. The Viking Press. ISBN 0-670-63591-X.
- de Clercq, Daan; Everts, Saskia; Langelaan, Michaja; Stoop, Ellen; van Voorst Vader-Duyckinck Sander, Jet (2010). Uit Een Bron van Weelde: Het leven van de Erven Stoop [From a Source of Wealth: The Lives of the Stoop Heirs]. Stichting Stoop-van Deventer.
- Koch, Jeroen (2023). De Kesslers: Een familiegeschiedenis in olie en staal. Boom-Amsterdam. ISBN 978-90-2442-705-5.
- Roberts, Glyn (1938). The Most Powerful Man in the World: The Life of Sir Henri Deterding. Hyperion. ISBN 0-88355-301-5.
- Shell Website - The History of Shell
- de Vries, Joh. (2013). "Kessler sr., Jean Baptiste August (1853-1900)". Biografisch Woordenboek van Nederland (in Dutch). Huygens Institut.

Business positions
Preceded by Johannes Arnoldus de Gelder	Managing Director of Royal Dutch Petroleum Company; 1893-1900	Succeeded by Henri Deterding
