= Henri Deterding =

Dutch entrepreneur (1886–1939)

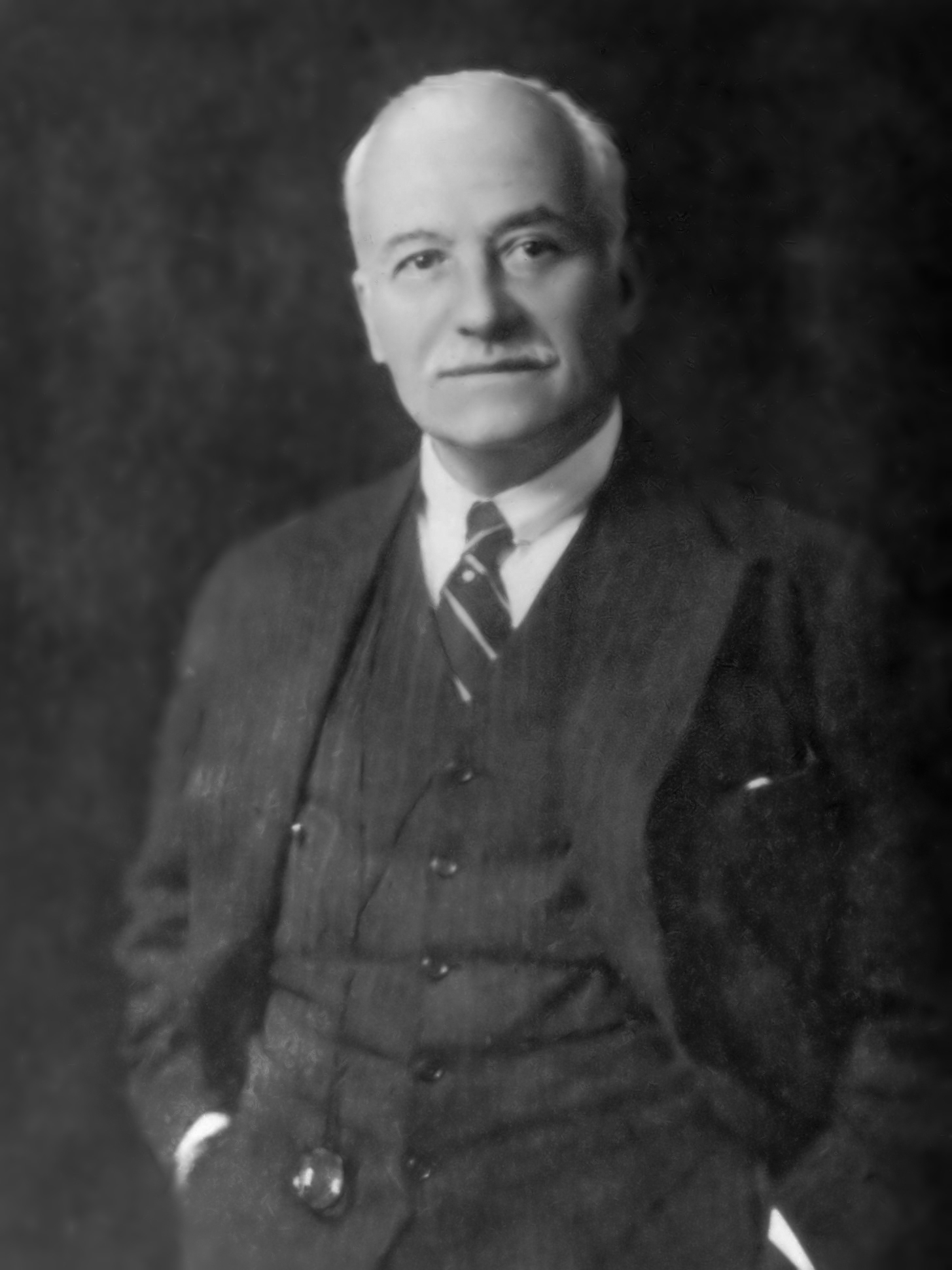
Henri Deterding

Henri Wilhelm August Deterding, KBE (19 April 1866 – 4 February 1939) was one of the first executives of the Royal Dutch Petroleum Company and was its general manager for 36 years, from 1900 to 1936, and was also chairman of the combined Royal Dutch/Shell oil company. He succeeded the founder of Royal Dutch, Jean Baptiste August Kessler, when he died, and made Royal Dutch Shell a competitor to John D. Rockefeller's Standard Oil and one of the world's largest petroleum companies.

In 1920, Deterding was made an honorary Knight Commander of the Order of the British Empire, for services to Anglo-Dutch relations and for his work in supplying the Allies with petroleum during the First World War. Deterding was a bitter enemy of the Soviet Union and helped thousands of White Russian exiles.

== Early life ==
Born in Amsterdam in 1866, the fourth child in a family of five, Deterding was the son of Philip Jacob Deterding, a merchant navy master mariner, and Catherina Adolphina Geertruida (née Kayser). His father died when Deterding was six.

As the family funds went to support the education of his older brothers, Henri was only educated up to the age of sixteen at the Higher Citizens' School in Amsterdam. At school, he was known for his ability to do quick mathematical computations in his head.

== Career ==
After leaving school, Deterding took a clerical position in the Twentsche Bank, where he developed a remarkable aptitude for handling figures. To avoid the slow promotion of a banking career, he entered an examination for positions in the Netherlands Trading Society of the Dutch East Indies, gained first place, and was appointed to the company's Eastern staff. After some years with the firm, he began to work in the oil industry, which was then in its infancy.

In May 1896, at the age of thirty, Deterding took a job with the Royal Dutch Oil Company, working with the managing director, J. B. A. Kessler. At the time, Royal Dutch was not a major company, still struggling to make good, and Deterding was instrumental in piloting it through many difficulties. Kessler died in March, 1900, leaving instructions, put in writing shortly before his death, that he wished Deterding to take over from him as general manager.

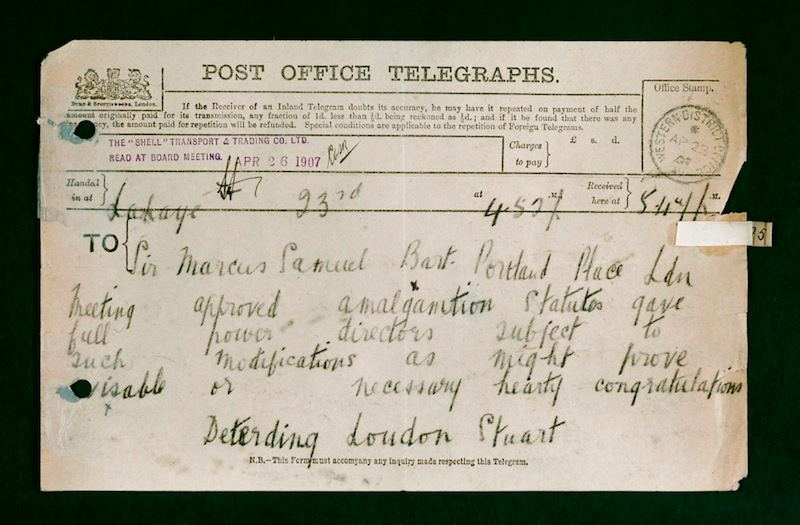
Message to Marcus Samuel from Deterding on the Royal Dutch Shell merger in 1907

Soon gaining the nickname of "the Napoleon of Oil", Deterding was responsible for developing the tanker fleet that enabled Royal Dutch to compete with the Shell company of Marcus Samuel. He led Royal Dutch to several major mergers and acquisitions, including the merger with Samuel's "Shell" Transport and Trading Company in 1907 and the purchase of Azerbaijan oil fields from the Rothschild family in 1911. In the last years of his life, Deterding was controversial when he became an admirer of the German Nazi Party. In 1936, he discussed with them the sale of a year's oil reserves on credit.

In 1936 he resigned from the position of general manager, but remained a member of the company's board.

== Personal life ==
In 1894, Deterding married firstly Catharina Neubronner, a Dutch woman, with whom he had two sons and a daughter. In 1924 he married secondly Lydia Pavlovna Koudoyaroff (1904–1980), a daughter of the White Russian General Paul Koudoyaroff. She had been the mistress of his rival Calouste Gulbenkian, and bore Deterding two daughters, including the socialite Olga Deterding. After that marriage ended in divorce in 1933, at the age of seventy Deterding married, lastly, Charlotte Mina Knack, a German who had been a secretary in the company and came from a prestigious coffee-trading family in Hamburg. They had two children together, Louisa and Henriette. Henriette married renowned pianist and industrialist Kurt Leimer.

During his second marriage, Deterding's English country house was Buckhurst Park, Winkfield, Berkshire, where Mrs Deterding continued to live with her two daughters after the 1936 divorce.

The British newspaper the Daily Mail mistakenly published Deterding's obituary on 27 June 1924, and the news was copied by The New York Times under the heading "Henry Deterding dies at film show; Director General of the Royal Dutch Company Succumbs Suddenly in The Hague". However, on that day the Dutch envoy in London, René de Marees van Swinderen, wrote in a letter to the Dutch foreign minister, Herman Adriaan van Karnebeek:

"P.S. I could not resist sending also herewith the obituary in the Daily Mail dedicated to Deterding, who happily is very much alive."

Deterding was a steadfast enemy of the Soviet Union, largely because of the nationalization of his properties in Azerbaijan. He was accused of conspiring against Soviet oil-interests and even of printing counterfeit Soviet money. He became a target for Soviet press attacks.

In 1936, Deterding bought the manor of Dobbin, near Krakow am See, in Mecklenburg, Germany, and moved there, becoming a neighbor of his friend the then-director of Deutsche Bank, Emil Georg von Stauß. He also had a property in Suvretta, St. Moritz, Switzerland, where he died on 4 February 1939. His body was returned to Dobbin to be buried there, but, in 1968, it was moved again, to a grave in Liechtenstein, where his daughter Henriette resided with her husband and Deterding's grandchildren.

Deterding's funeral was hosted by the Nazi government to honour one of the NSDAP's most generous financiers, ardent anti-bolshevik and supporter of the Nazi-regime.

== See also ==
- The Prize: The Epic Quest for Oil, Money, and Power
- List of honorary British knights and dames

Business positions
Preceded by Jean Baptiste August Kessler	Managing director of Royal Dutch Petroleum Company; 1901–1902	Succeeded by himself from 1902 there were co-existing MDs the General MD was created in 1902 as the senior executive
Preceded by himself as the sole managing director	General managing director of Royal Dutch Petroleum Company; 1902–1936	Succeeded by Frits de Kok
