= List of chairmen of Shell =

Chairmen of Shell

Shell plc is the world's second largest public petroleum company and since 20 July 2005 its senior official has been its chairman. Until their amalgamation in 2005, the Royal Dutch Petroleum Company and the Shell Transport and Trading Company had separate leaders. From 1946 to 2005, an additional office was created to oversee their group of companies. The following is a list of senior officials of the Royal Dutch Petroleum Company, Shell Transport and Trading Company, Royal Dutch/Shell Group, and Shell plc.

Andrew Mackenzie has been the chairman since 2021.

== Royal Dutch Petroleum (1890–2005) ==
Although a committee of managing directors had existed since the company's inception in 1890, the office of General Managing Director was not created until 17 December 1902. On 21 October 1956 the title changed to President-Director. The office was abolished on 20 July 2005 when Royal Dutch Petroleum and Shell Transport amalgamated.

- Henri Deterding, 1902–1936
- Frits de Kok, 1937–1940
- vacant, 28 October 1940 – 2 January 1947
- Guus Kessler, 1947–1948
- Barthold Theodoor Willem van Hasselt, 1949–1951
- John Hugo Loudon, 1952–1965
- Jan Brouwer, 1965–1970
- Gerrit Wagner, 1971–1977
- Dirk de Bruyne, 1977–1982
- Lodewijk Christiaan van Wachem, 1982–1992
- Cor Herkströter, 1992–1998
- Maarten van den Bergh, 1998–2000
- Jeroen van der Veer, 2000–2005

== The "Shell" Transport and Trading Company (1897–2005) ==
The senior official of Shell Transport and Trading was its chairman, created 18 October 1897. The office was abolished on 20 July 2005 when Royal Dutch Petroleum and Shell Transport amalgamated.

- Marcus Samuel, 1897–1921
- Walter Samuel, 1921–1946
- Frederick Godber, 1946–1961
- Frederick Stephens, 1961–1967
- Sir David Barran, 1967–1972
- Francis McFadzean, 1972–1976
- Carmichael Pocock, 1976–1979
- Sir Peter Baxendell, 1979–1985
- Sir Peter Holmes, 1985–1993
- Sir John Jennings, 1993–1997
- Sir Mark Moody-Stuart, 1997–2001
- Sir Philip Watts, 2001–2004
- Sir Ronald Oxburgh, 2004–2005

== Royal Dutch/Shell Group (1907–2005) ==
Following the union of Royal Dutch and Shell in 1907, both companies retained their own senior officials. In 1946, the Committee of Managing Directors was established to oversee the group of companies, and was led by a chairman. The Chairman of the committee was either the Managing Director/President-Director of Royal Dutch, or the Chairman of Shell. In October 2004 the Committee of Managing Directors was renamed the executive committee. The office was abolished on 20 July 2005 when Royal Dutch Petroleum and Shell Transport amalgamated.

- Guus Kessler, 1946–1948
- Barthold Theodoor Willem van Hasselt, 1949–1951
- John Hugo Loudon, 1952–1965
- Jan Brouwer, 1965–1970
- Sir David Barran, 1970–1972
- Gerrit Wagner, 1972–1977
- Carmichael Pocock, 1977–1979
- Dirk de Bruyne, 1979–1982
- Sir Peter Baxendell, 1982–1985
- Lodewijk Christiaan van Wachem, 1985–1992
- Sir Peter Holmes, 1992–1993
- Cor Herkströter, 1993–1998
- Sir Mark Moody-Stuart, 1998–2001
- Sir Philip Watts, 2001–2004
- Jeroen van der Veer, 2004–2005

== Royal Dutch Shell plc (2005–2022) and Shell plc (2022–) ==
When Royal Dutch and Shell consolidated into a single company on 20 July 2005, the company's senior official became the chairman of the board of directors.

- Aad Jacobs, 2005–2006
- Jorma Ollila, 2006–2015
- Charles Holliday, 2015–2021
- Andrew Mackenzie, 2021–
