= De Sitter (disambiguation) =

Willem de Sitter (1872–1934) was a Dutch mathematician, physicist and astronomer.

De Sitter may also refer to:

- De Sitter (crater), a lunar crater
- 1686 De Sitter, an asteroid

== People with the surname ==
- Ulbo de Sitter (1902–1980), Dutch geologist
- Ulbo de Sitter (sociologist) (1930–2010), Dutch sociologist whose work has been further developed by Jan in 't Veld

== See also ==
- De Sitter space and anti-de Sitter space, models of spacetime
- De Sitter universe, a solution to general relativity
- De Sitter effect (disambiguation)
- Sitter (disambiguation)
