= Sitter =

Sitter may refer to:

== Roles ==
- Babysitter, one who temporarily cares for a child
- Trip sitter, one who remains sober while another person is under the influence of a drug
- Companion (caregiving), one who is hired to work with a patient
- Sitter, one who sits as the subject of a portrait painting or portrait photograph

== Films ==
- The Sitter, a 2011 film starring Jonah Hill
- The Sitter (1991 film), starring Kim Myers
- The Sitter (1977 film), a 1977 American short film
- While the Children Sleep or The Sitter, a 2007 film starring Mariana Klaveno

== People with the surname ==
- Carl L. Sitter (1922–2000), United States Marine Corps officer and Medal of Honor recipient
- Inger Sitter (1929–2015), Norwegian artist

== Other uses ==
- Sitter (BEAM), a type of robot that does not move
- Sitters, Germany, a municipality in Germany
- Sitter (river), Switzerland

== See also ==
- Model (art)
- De Sitter (disambiguation)
- Babysitter (disambiguation)
- House sitter (disambiguation)
