= Van de Vijver =

Van de Vijver is a Dutch toponymic surname meaning "from the pond". Notable people with the surname include:

- Arthur Van De Vijver (1948–1992), Belgian racing cyclist
- Fons van de Vijver (1952–2019), Dutch psychologist
- Frank Van De Vijver (born 1962), former Belgian racing cyclist
- Heidi Van De Vijver (born 1969), former Belgian racing cyclist
- Walter van de Vijver (born 1955), Dutch businessman

Van de Vyver

- Augustine Van de Vyver (1844–1911), Belgian-American Catholic priest
- Ilka Van de Vyver (born 1993), Belgian volleyball player

Van de Weijer

- Jeroen van de Weijer (born 1965), Dutch linguist

Vyver

- Bertha Vyver (1854–1941), English novelist

== See also ==
- Weijers
- Van der Vyver
