= Amsterdam Global Conference on Sustainability and Transparency =

2006–2010 conference

The Amsterdam Global Conference on Sustainability and Transparency was held for the third time in May 2010. Over the years, the conference has seen the world’s largest gathering of leaders, thinkers and doers in the field of sustainability reporting, with debates being convened on how reporting can be used to help build a better future. Thought leaders from business, finance, government and civil society have been brought together to debate the political, strategic and practical choices confronting the world and expert practitioners have led workshops and interactive sessions to define the building blocks of more effective reporting.

The first Amsterdam Global Conference on Sustainability and Transparency, held by the Global Reporting Initiative (GRI), took place in October 2006, with over 1,200 participants. In May 2008, the second Amsterdam Global Conference was held. This climate neutral conference brought together over 1,000 participants from 58 countries. The 2010 Amsterdam Global Conference on Sustainability and Transparency was held from 26–28 May 2010 at the Amsterdam RAI Exhibition and Convention Centre in The Netherlands.

== 2010 conference themes ==
- Rethink Our resource consumption has gone beyond what our planet can sustain, yet billions continue to live in poverty. The world’s population is set to increase massively and more and more people will, understandably, expect to live the lifestyles currently enjoyed by the few. This unsustainable outlook has become a core business issue, requiring companies and governments to rethink the fundamentals.
- Rebuild As we climb out of global recession we have a unique opportunity — and an urgent need — to rebuild our economies to meet the challenges of the future, not the past. We have the opportunity to drive the transition to sustainable practices, where sustainability is at the core of public policy and business strategy, evident in products and processes, and key to consumer choices.
- Report Sustainability reporting can be an effective tool for change. Credible disclosures map out current positions and point the way forwards, towards solutions that benefit both business and wider society. Full economic, environmental and social accountability is based on transparent communication. Transparent communication changes perceptions, builds trust, and motivates action towards greater sustainability.

== 2010 conference in review ==
The third GRI Global Conference on Sustainability and Transparency attracted more participants than ever before and from a greater number of countries. In 2010, 77 countries were represented with over 1200 attendees. Participants enjoyed a diverse range of topics in 60 main hall, parallel, and academic sessions on best practices in ESG disclosure and the future of sustainability reporting.

During the Opening Plenary, GRI’s chief executive Ernst Ligteringen outlined two goals for the next decade:

1. GRI proposes that environmental, social, and governance (ESG) reporting should become a general practice to help markets and society take informed and responsible decisions. GRI advocates that by 2015 all large and medium-sized companies in OECD countries and fast-growing emerging economies should be required to report publicly on their ESG performance, or if they don’t, explain why.
2. GRI proposes that ESG reporting and financial reporting need to converge over the coming decade. GRI advocates that a standard for integrated reporting should be defined, tested and adopted by 2020. In line with this, The Prince’s Accounting for Sustainability Project (A4S) and the Global Reporting Initiative (GRI) announced the formation of the International Integrated Reporting Committee (IIRC).

== History ==
Over 1000 participants from more than 50 countries attended each of the first biennial conferences in 2006 and 2008. Of the participants, over 40% came from countries outside of Europe. 10% of participants at the previous two conferences were CEO/Board of Director level, and over 30% were vice presidents, senior managers, or heads of departments. Industries represented included automotive, food and beverage, mining and metals, apparel, IT, oil and gas, construction and real estate, media, telecommunications, and logistics. In addition representatives from finance, NGOs, accountancy, government and regulatory bodies attended the previous two conferences.

Conference speaker alumni include:

- His Royal Highness Willem Alexander, Prince of Orange, The Netherlands
- Al Gore, former United States vice president
- Sir Mark Moody-Stuart, chairman Anglo American
- Kumi Naidoo, honorary president CIVICUS (now executive director at Greenpeace International)
- Rajendra K. Pachauri, chairman Intergovernmental Panel on Climate Change (IPCC)
- Achim Steiner, executive director United Nations Environmental Programme (UNEP)
- Margot Wallström, vice president European Commission
- Queen Rania of Jordan

== Organizers ==
This conference was organized by Global Reporting Initiative based in Amsterdam, the Netherlands. The Global Reporting Initiative has pioneered the development of the world’s most widely used sustainability reporting framework and is committed to its continuous improvement and application worldwide. This framework sets out the principles and indicators that organizations can use to measure and report their economic, environmental, and social performance.

== See also ==
- Integrated reporting
- Socially responsible investing
- Corporate social responsibility
