= Philip Watts =

Church of england priest

Sir Philip Beverley Watts KCMG (born 25 June 1945) is a former chairman of the multinational energy company Shell and a priest in the Church of England.

== Early life ==
Watts was born on 25 June 1945 in Leicester and grew up in the Midlands where his father worked in the textile industry. He attended the Wyggeston and Dixie grammar schools in Leicestershire and the University of Leeds where he studied physics, graduating as BSc in 1968. After university he taught briefly in Sierra Leone before returning to Leeds to study for a master's degree in geophysics (MA).

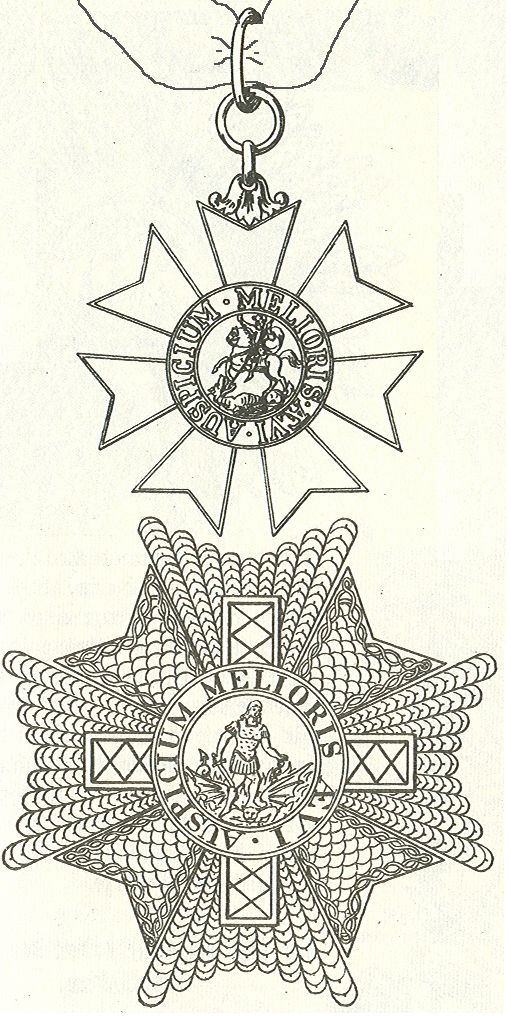
Star and badge of KCMG

In 1969 Watts joined Shell for whom he worked until 2004. In October 2012, he was appointed priest-in-charge of Waltham St Lawrence parish church.

== Shell career ==
- 1969–1983; Seismologist
- 1983–1987; Exploration director, Shell UK
- 1987–1991; Various in Shell's production liaison and planning operations
- 1991–1994; managing director, Shell Nigeria
- 1994–1995; Regional coordinator, Shell Europe
- 1995–1998; Director for "Strategic Planning, Sustainable Development, and External Affairs", Shell International
- 1998–2001; managing director, and CEO Exploration and Production Division
- 2001–2004; Chairman

== Nigeria ==
During Watts's tenure as managing director of Shell Nigeria in the early 1990s a major area of exploration in the country was the oil-rich Niger River delta and here Shell came into conflict with the Ogoni people. The conflict with the Ogonis eventually culminated in the execution by the Nigerian regime of activist Ken Saro-Wiwa. In 2002 a class action lawsuit was filed by the Philadelphia law firm of Berger & Montague alleging that Shell "engaged in militarized commerce in a conspiracy with the former military government of Nigeria…purchasing ammunition and using its helicopters and boats and providing logistical support for … a military foray into Ogoniland designed to terrorize the civilian population into ending peaceful protests." Shell dismissed the allegations as "groundless", but Watts was questioned in London by representatives of Berger & Montague in mid-April 2004 although he was not named a defendant in the lawsuit, which was brought solely against the company.

== Business reputation ==
Watts succeeded Sir Mark Moody-Stuart in mid-2001 as chairman of Shell's "Committee of Managing Directors". Within Shell this appointment was greeted with some surprise as the seemingly abrasive Watts was a contrast with his patrician predecessor. Externally the appointment was at first welcomed as a sign that Shell was going to move aggressively to reduce costs, however Watts soon fell into disfavour with Shell's institutional investors, in large part because he was seen as aloof and uncommunicative. This unpopularity was reflected inside Shell where many were privately critical of his aggressive form of management and poor communications style. His devotion to Shell could not be faulted and he wore a ring on his right hand which had been engraved with the Shell symbol, the pecten.

Delivering the keynote address at the opening of the Shell Centre for Sustainability at Houston's Rice University in March 2003, Watts spoke out forcefully in favour of Sustainable Development. Later that year he was knighted by Queen Elizabeth II for "services to British business and to the World Business Council for Sustainable Development", which he served as chairman.

== Reserves ==
Less than three years after taking over the chairmanship Watts was swept out of office in early 2004 by revelations that the company had overstated its proved oil and gas reserves by nearly 25 percent.

On 9 January 2004, Shell announced that it was cutting its estimate of proven oil and gas reserves by roughly 3.9 billion barrels, close to 20 percent of total reserves. Investors began calling for Watts to resign.

Reports surfaced of internal memoranda addressed to many of Shell's senior executives months earlier discussing the possibility that the company's proven reserves had been overestimated. Watts had stated that he had not been informed that there might be a need to restate reserves until late in 2003. During 2003, increasingly fractious e-mails from Walter van de Vijver, Watts' successor as CEO of Shell Exploration and Production, made it clear that senior executives had been discussing the issues around reserves for some time. In an appearance in front of around 1,000 staff in Shell Centre's sports hall in January 2004, Watts stated that he had been informed of the problem in late 2003 and that his first response had been to write down on a piece of paper that he (and, by implication, Shell) should 'get the facts and do the right thing.'

In April 2004, the US law firm of Davis Polk & Wardwell released a report on its review of Shell's reserves overbooking crisis. The report alleged that top company executives, including Watts, had known about the reserves shortfall since early 2002. As a result of the Davis Polk Report, the Board asked Watts to resign.

Watts (who had consistently said that he had "...acted properly and in good faith at all times") was investigated by the UK Financial Services Authority (FSA) about his role in relation to the recategorisation of the company's hydrocarbon reserves. In November 2005 the FSA announced that it had "closed its inquiries" when its "Regulatory Decisions Committee," decided that the regulator should take no action. Watts had earlier been refused permission to proceed with a counter action against the FSA by the "Financial Services and Markets Tribunal" when he filed an action seeking to show that the FSA had unfairly prejudiced him in statements made in its settlement with Shell that appeared to condone the findings in the Davis Polk report.

Watts was also investigated by the US Justice Department and the Securities and Exchange Commission for allegedly misleading the stock market by allowing the overstated reserves figures to stand. These investigations are now closed with "no case to answer."

The Securities and Exchange Commission has proposed new regulations regarding the accounting of oil reserves that, according to a Dow Jones article may serve to vindicate Watts, since the proposed changes involve changing many of the SEC proved reserves criteria that prompted Shell's large debooking.

== Retirement ==
Watts and his wife live at Binfield, Berkshire, where he serves as a curate after his ordination as a priest in 2011.

== Styles ==
- Mr Philip Watts (1945–2004)
- Sir Philip Watts KCMG (2004–11)
- The Revd Sir Philip Watts KCMG (2011–present)

Business positions
Preceded by Mark Moody-Stuart	Chairman of the Committee of Managing Directors of Royal Dutch Shell; 2001–2004	Succeeded by Jeroen van der Veer
Preceded by Mark Moody-Stuart	Chairman of Shell Transport and Trading; 2001–2004	Succeeded by Ronald Oxburgh, Baron Oxburgh
