= Jonkheer Hugo Loudon =

Dutch engineer (1860 -1941)

Jonkheer Hugo Loudon or Hugo Loudon (1860–1941) was a Dutch engineer, petroleum explorer, and oil executive. He was one of the pioneers who built up The Royal Dutch company (later Royal Dutch Shell) and a key figure in finding new oil sources for the company during its early days.

== Biography ==
Loudon was born on June 18, 1860, in The Hague, Netherlands. He was a member of the Loudon family, which occupied a central place within the Dutch establishment. His father, James Loudon served as the governor-general of the Dutch East Indies. His brother, Jonkheer J. Loudon, was the Dutch Foreign Minister during World War I.

Little is known about Loudon’s early life. Accessible records show that he studied engineering at the Technical University in Delft and completed his degree in 1885. It is noted that he was the first to break his family’s civil service tradition. He then gained employment at a land reclamation in Hungary. After this, he worked for the South African Railways in the Transvaal from 1894 to 1902. During the latter part of this period, he was already associated with The Royal Dutch Shell.

Loudon is considered a founder of The Royal Dutch Petroleum Company of The Netherlands, alongside August Kessler and Henri Deterding. In the 1890s, Loudon was able to secure a crucial contract with Aceh’s local ruler for the Perlak oil field exploration. Around 1896, an oil field (Perlak 1) was discovered and drilling commenced in 1899. This discovery became pivotal in the growth of the Royal Dutch Shell.

In 1894, Loudon became Royal Dutch Shell’s general manager, a position he held until 1902 after his appointment as president. Loudon was succeeded by Hendrik Colijin as Royal Dutch general manager. Colijin would later become the Netherlands’ Prime Minister. In 1929, Loudon was elected as the Chairman of the Royal Dutch Board of Directors.

== Personal life ==
Loudon married Anna Petronella, daughter of Willem van Marken, in 1903. The couple had one son, Jonkheer James Willem. Loudon died on September 6, 1941 at The Hague. John Hugo Loudon, who was Shell’s CEO from 1952 to 1965 and chairman for more than a decade, was his grandson.
