= Serhiy Kot =

Ukrainian historian (1958–2022)

- Сергій Іванович Кот
- Born: 22 June 1958; Kyiv, Ukrainian SSR, USSR
- Died: 28 March 2022 (aged 63); Iziaslav, Khmelnytskyi Oblast, Ukraine
- Occupation: Historian
- Organizations: National Academy of Sciences of Ukraine
- Awards: Merited Culture Worker of Ukraine

Serhiy Ivanovych Kot (Ukrainian: Сергій Іванович Кот; 22 June 1958 – 28 March 2022) was a Ukrainian historian. A senior researcher at the Institute of History of Ukraine of the National Academy of Sciences of Ukraine, he focused on preservation of historical and cultural property, history of conservation and burial work in Ukraine, cultural property return and restitution. He was a member of the history museum's board, and was awarded the title Merited Culture Worker of Ukraine.

== Life and career ==
Kot was born in Kyiv. He graduated from the Faculty of History and Pedagogy of the Kyiv State Pedagogical Institute in 1980. In 1990, he was promoted to the doctorate of history, with a dissertation titled Охорона пам'яток історії та культури в Українській РСР (1943-поч. 60-х рр.) (Conservation of Historical and Cultural Monuments in the Ukrainian Soviet Socialist Republic (1943–post-1960s)). Kot was habilitated in history in 2021; his habilitation was titled Повернення і реституція культурних цінностей у політичному та культурному житті України (ХХ – поч. ХХІ ст.) (Return and Restitution of Cultural Values in the Political and Cultural Life of Ukraine (20th–early 21st century)).

=== National Academy of Sciences of Ukraine ===
Kot worked at the Institute of History of Ukraine of the National Academy of Sciences of Ukraine. He became head of the Centre for the Study of the Problems of the Return and Restitution of Cultural Treasure in 1999, a position he held for life. In his research, he focused on preservation of historical and cultural heritage, history of establishment of heritage conservation in Ukraine, return and restitution of cultural property. From 2006, he was also "senior researcher" at the Centre for Ukrainian History and Culture, promoted to the department's head in 2012. In 2009, he researched from March to June on a Fulbright scholarship about The U.S. Policy of Restitution of Cultural Values After World War II. From 2013 until his death, Kot was head of the Centre for the Study of Historical and Cultural Heritage of Ukraine at the National Academy of Sciences. In 2020, Kot was instrumental in seeking restitution of a painting by Lucas Cranach, a diptych of Adam and Eve unlawfully taken to Saint Petersburg and now at the Norton Simon Museum in Pasadena, to Ukraine.

=== Other functions ===
In 1999 and 2000, Kot was a member of a group of the Supreme Council of Ukraine for Culture and Spirituality, which prepared a draft for a law "On the Protection of Cultural Heritage" submitted on 8 June 2000; he authored 35 editorial amendments and formulas which were included in the text of the law.

Kot was deputy head of the editorial board of the Ukrainian Historical and Cultural Museum from 2012. From 2013 until his death, he served as a member of the scientific council of the National Sanctuary "Sophia of Kyiv". He was head of the board of the foundation for the literary work of Oleh Olzhych. He was awarded the title Merited Culture Worker of Ukraine.

Kot died in Iziaslav on 28 March 2022, at age 63.

== Publications ==
Kot's publications include a 1989 book about local history in the Ukrainian SSR, and books about Ukrainian cultural values in Russia, and the problems of their return in the context of history and law, published in 1996 and 1998. He prepared a book that appeared in 2006 in London and Kyiv: Lancelot Lawton, Ukrainian Question. Ланцелот Лоутон Украiнське питання. It is a collection of articles by the British journalist Lancelot Lawton about the status of Ukraine in the 1930s; Kot spent two years tracing Lawton's original articles, held by the Library of Congress in the U.S. In 2010, he published research about the destiny and legal status of the exhibits of a 1941 traveling exhibition of the State Museum in the Crimea, held in museums of Crimea.

He wrote scientific works about the history of the national revolutionary movement, the Bukovina region, and the Babyn Yar massacre.
