= St Francis Xavier's College, Liverpool =

St. Francis Xavier's catholic academy
- School crest

Location
- Woolton Hill Road; Woolton; Liverpool, Merseyside, L25 6EG; England; 53.382662°N 2.880281°W

Information
- Type: 11–18 boys Academy
- Motto: "...life in all its fullness." Jn 10:10
- Religious affiliation: Roman Catholic
- Established: October 27, 1842; 183 years ago
- Founder: Society of Jesus
- Local authority: Liverpool City Council
- Specialist: Mathematics and Computing College
- Department for Education URN: 138463 Tables
- Ofsted: Reports
- Chair: Andrew Keeley
- Headteacher: David Hayes
- Staff: 130
- Gender: Boys
- Age: 11 to 18
- Enrolment: 1297
- Houses: Almond, Bryant, Campion, Kemble, Mayne, Lewis, Owen, Rigby
- Colours: Year 7-11; Burgendy & Azure; Year 12-13; Black & Blue
- Publication: SFXtra and Prospectus
- Website: www.sfx1842.org

St Francis Xavier's College (abbreviated SFX) is an 11–18 boys Roman Catholic secondary school and sixth form with academy status located in Woolton, Liverpool, England. The college is under the trusteeship of the Brothers of Christian Instruction. Their mission is that of their founder, Jean Marie de la Mennais, "To make Jesus better known and loved". By October 2021, a total of 1,097 boys attended the school, 108 of whom were in the Sixth Form provision.

The school is a specialist school for mathematics and computing, and was the first school in Liverpool to gain specialist school status in that category. The schools most recent inspection by Ofsted took place in October 2021, and inspectors concluded that the school "required improvement" across all areas, including quality of education provided, behaviour and attitude of pupils attending the school, as well as leadership and management.

== History ==
=== Establishment ===
The college was founded in 1842 in association with Stonyhurst College, Lancashire by the Society of Jesus which is a Roman Catholic religious order.

The college had a rector from 1842 to 1844. It had two pupils.

A year later, it had a dozen pupils. Father Francis Lythgoe moved the college to St. Anne Street where it stayed until 1845. In 1844 Father Johnson took over from Father Francis Lythgoe and moved his 24 pupils to the newly opened Presbytery on Salisbury Street. Father Collyns took over the college in 1853. With more than 50 pupils the rector Father Collyns decided that a new premises was needed. By 1856 the college had its own building built alongside the Presbytery and in 1877 a new college was built on 6 Salisbury Street.

=== Second college building ===
The newest Salisbury Street building was designed by Henry Clutton, a Catholic architect. He used the designs of Father Vaughan as the bases of his designs. The new college was completed in the summer of 1877 and cost £30,000.

=== Move to Woolton ===
In 1961 the college was transferred as a grammar school to its present twenty-six-acre site at High Lee, Woolton. From 1984 to 1990 the Lower School site for Years 7, 8 and 9 was located on Queens Drive (Formerly Cardinal Newman RC) in Wavertree. Later, the Lower School was re-sited with the Upper School at High Lee. In 1990, the college opted out of local authority control, becoming a grant-maintained school. The college was granted Technology College status from April 1996. In September 1999 it became a Foundation School. In 1992, the college became co-educational in the sixth form and in September 2000 the De La Mennais Sixth Form Centre was opened.

== Overview ==
=== School uniform ===
All boys attending the school are expected to wear the agreed school uniform which is determined through the schools School Uniform policy. The current school uniform for boys consists of;

- Maroon school blazer (Years 7–11)
- Black school blazer (Years 12–13)
- Black, normal style school trousers
- Plain white school shirt
- School pullover with embroidered school badge
- School tie
- Black school shoes

Boys attending the school are permitted only to wear formal style school shoes, with pumps, trainers, or walking boots being forbidden. Additionally, the wearing of make up by pupils is also forbidden for pupils in Years 7–11.

=== Curriculum ===
All boys attending the school, and who are in Years 7–9, are taught at Key Stage 3 with a curriculum designed "to offer students a broad and balanced opportunity to experience a wide range of subjects". Subjects studied between Years 7–9 include English, Mathematics, Science, Religious Education, Modern Foreign Language (Spanish and French), Humanities (History and Geography), Creative Arts and Design (Music, Art, Design and Technology), Computing, Physical Education, PSHCE, and Literacy and Reading.

For boys in Years 10–11, they are taught at Key Stage 4 and study the core curriculum subjects of English, Maths, Science, Physical Education and Religious Studies. Additionally, boys have the option of choosing other subjects, either at GCSE, Vocational Award or Cambridge National level. Such optional subjects include Art, Biology, Business Studies, Chemistry, Computer Science, Engineering, Film Studies, French, Geography, History, Information Technology, Music, PE, Physics, Spanish, Sport, Technology and PSHCE.

Pupils in Years 12–13 are taught at Key Stage 5, and pupils are granted a degree of flexibility over their subject choices. Pupils are provided with a choice of 15 A Levels, 3 BTECs, 1 CTEC and 2 Cambridge Technical awards to choose from. Pupils may additional wish to undertake courses provided at St Julies, the schools collaborative partner where pupils have the option to choose an additional 6 A Levels, 1 BTEC and 1 Technical Certificate.

=== School choir ===
The choir was formed in 1994 and has performed in front of Pope John Paul II. They have toured Europe and the United States, and gained a place in the Guinness Book of Records for singing at every cathedral in England and Wales.

The school sang on the reworked version of The Farm's 1990 hit "Alltogethernow", remixed by BBC Radio 1's DJ Spoony. The single, which reached number 10 in the UK Singles Chart, was the official song for the England football team at the UEFA Euro 2004 competition. It was performed by the choir on Top of the Pops in 2004.

=== Head Teachers ===
| David Hayes | 2021 | Present |
| Peter Evans | 2020 | 2021 |
| Paul Halliwell | 2019 | 2020 |
| Patrick Ferguson / Kevin Maddocks | 2019 | 2019 |
| David Yates | 2018 | 2019 |
| Gez Flowers | 2016 | 2018 |
| Leslie D Rippon | 2004 | 2016 |
| Brother Francis Patterson | 1979 | 2004 |
| Brother Robert Power | 1974 | 1979 |
| Father Doyle | 1962 | 1974 |
| Father Edward James Warner | 1953 | 1961 |
| Father Neylan | 1939 | 1953 |
| Father Brinkworth | 1937 | 1938 |
| Father Woodlock | 1919 | 1937 |
| Father J. Sponson | 1902 | 1919 |
| Father Thomas Poter | 1870 | 1902 |
| Father Collyns | 1853 | 1870 |
| Father West | 1851 | 1853 |
| Father Johnson | 1844 | 1853 |
| Father Francis Lythgoe | 1842 | 1844 |

=== Notable former pupils ===
- Peter Baxendell - Chairman of the Committee of Managing Directors of the Royal Dutch/Shell Group of companies
- James Clement Baxter – Liberal politician and former chairman of Everton FC
- Piaras Béaslaí (Percy Beazley) – Irish revolutionary and writer
- Charles Brabin – American film director
- Keith Briffa – climatologist
- Denis Cosgrove – former professor of geography at the University of California, Los Angeles
- Gabriel George Coury – recipient of the Victoria Cross
- Chris Crookall – actor
- Walter Bryan Emery – former Edwards Professor of Egyptian Archaeology and Philology at University College London
- Jon Flanagan – footballer
- Paul Gallagher – Roman Catholic cleric and diplomat, titular archbishop of Hodelm
- John Gregson – actor
- Franny Griffiths – musician
- Augustine Harris – Catholic Bishop of Middlesbrough from 1978 to 1992, prison chaplain at HM Prison Liverpool from 1952 to 1965
- George Hartland – Conservative MP for Norwich from 1931 to 1935
- Paul Aloysius Kenna – recipient of the Victoria Cross
- Lancelot Lawton – British historian, military officer, scholar of Ukrainian studies
- Sammy Lee – former footballer and assistant manager of Liverpool FC
- George Lynskey – High Court judge on the former King's Bench
- Vincent Malone – bishop
- Jimmy McGovern – screenwriter
- Brian Nash - musician
- Mike Newell – footballer
- Laurence O'Keeffe – UK ambassador to Czechoslovakia from 1988 to 1991, and to Senegal from 1982 to 1985
- Edward J. Phelan – director-general of the International Labour Organization
- Paul Raymond – publisher of pornographic magazines
- Peter Serafinowicz – actor, writer, comedian
- Leslie Stuart – composer of Edwardian musical comedies
- Tony Warner – footballer
- Michael Xavier – musical theatre actor

== See also ==
- St Francis Xavier
- St Francis Xavier Church, Liverpool
- Secondary school
- Foundation school
- List of Jesuit sites
