= Henk Lombaers =

Dutch mathematician

Henk Joseph Maria (Henk) Lombaers (Doorn, 1920 – 29 August 2007) was a Dutch mathematician, Professor at Delft University of Technology and a pioneer in the field of operations research in the Netherlands.

== Life and work ==
Lombaers undertook teacher training. He studied chemistry in Amsterdam but had to terminate his studies prematurely due to the German occupation. From 1945 to 1956 he was employed by the Royal Netherlands Army, where he was involved in the introduction of radar-aircraft artillery.

In 1956 he joined Koninklijke Hoogovens as an operational researcher. At Hoogovens he conducted research on the transhipment capacity of the port installations using computer simulations. He also looked into the statistical aspects of simulation.

In 1968 he was appointed Professor of Quantitative Aspects of Business Administration at the Technical University of Delft, where he held his inaugural address on "Voorzien en verzinnen” (Forecast and Invention). In 1985 he retired with the speech, entitled "Daar moet je maar niet te hard op rekenen" (You shouldn't count on it too much). In Delft Lombaers was succeeded by Joop Evers, who had been Professor at the University of Twente.

The PhD students under Lombaers were Jack P.C. Kleijnen (Emeritus Professor of Simulation and Information Systems at Tilburg University (TiU), who graduated in 1971, Hendrik van der Meerendonk also in 1971, Johannes Botman in 1981, and Jaap van den Herik in 1983.

== Selected publications ==
- 1968. Voorzien en verzinnen. Rotterdam : Universitaire Pers Rotterdam
- 1969. Trio-logie: Variaties over een thema uit de bedrijfsleer. With Pierre Malotaux and Jan in 't Veld.
- 1969. Operationele research in Nederland. Het Spectrum.
- 1970. Project planning by network analysis; proceedings of the second international congress Amsterdam, the Netherlands, 6–10 October 1969. H.J.M. Lombaers (ed.).
- 1985. Daar moet je maar niet te hard op rekenen. Delftse Universitaire Pers
- 1985. Operations research : praktijk en theorie : symposium ter gelegenheid van het afscheid van prof. H.J.M. Lombaers gehouden op 6 juni 1985 te Delft. Wil Heins (ed.). Delftse Universitaire Pers.
