= Lodewijk Christiaan van Wachem =

Dutch businessman (1931–2019)

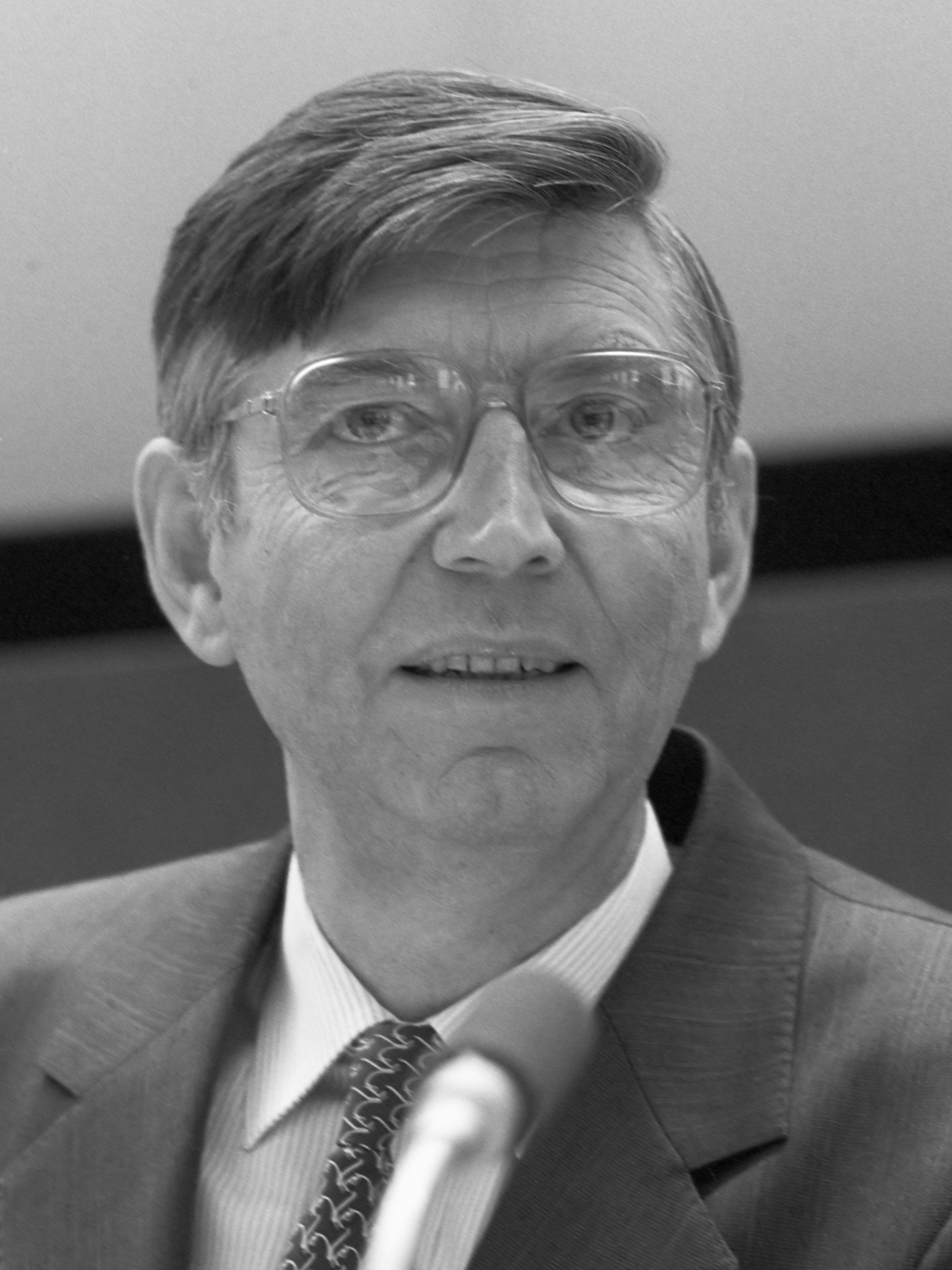
Lodewijk Christiaan van Wachem (1988)

Lodewijk Christiaan van Wachem (born 31 July 1931, Pangkalan Brandan - 24 August 2019, Wassenaar) was a Dutch businessman. Born in the birthplace of Royal Dutch Shell, he was appointed a managing director of Royal Dutch Petroleum in 1977. He was the President of Royal Dutch Shell from 1982 until 1992.

== Awards ==
- 1990 Commandeur in de Orde van Orange-Nassau
- Ridder in de orde van de Nederlandse Leeuw
- 1988 Knights of the Order of the British Empire, post Knight Commander of the Most Excellent Order of the British Empire (KBE)
- 2004 Honorary Citizen of Singapore

Business positions
Preceded by Peter Baxendell	Chairman of the Committee of Managing Directors of Royal Dutch Shell; 1985–1992	Succeeded by Peter Fenwick Holmes
Preceded by Dirk de Bruyne	President-Director of Royal Dutch Petroleum Company; 1982–1992	Succeeded by Cor Herkströter
