= Joseph Pocock =

English cricketer and soldier

Personal information
- Full name: Joseph Albert Pocock
- Born: 23 March 1884; Bedminster, Somerset, England
- Died: 8 August 1971 (aged 87); Bristol, England
- Batting: Unknown
- Bowling: Unknown

Domestic team information
- Years: Team
- 1923/24–1924/25: Europeans

Career statistics
Competition	First-class
Matches	3
Runs scored	11
Batting average	5.50
100s/50s	–/–
Top score	7*
Balls bowled	1,014
Wickets	16
Bowling average	33.12
5 wickets in innings	2
10 wickets in match	–
Best bowling	5/66
Catches/stumpings	–/–
- Source: ESPNcricinfo, 7 December 2023

Joseph Albert Pocock (23 March 1884 – 8 August 1971) was an English first-class cricketer and an officer in both the British Army and the British Indian Army.

Pocock was born in March 1884 at Bedminster, Somerset. Pocock gained a non-commissioned rank in the Royal Engineers, holding the rank of quartermaster-sergeant into the First World War. It was during the war that he gained a commission as a second lieutenant in April 1915, with promotion to lieutenant following in July 1917. Following the war, Pocock transferred to the British Indian Army Corps of Engineers in January 1922, with the rank of captain. In India, Pocock made three appearances in first-class cricket for the Europeans cricket team, making two appearances in the 1923–24 Bombay Quadrangular against the Parsees and the Hindus, with a further appearance coming in the 1924–25 Bombay Quadrangular against the Hindus, with all three matches played in Bombay. Playing as a bowler, he took 16 wickets at an average of 33.12; he took two five wicket hauls, with best figures of 5 for 66.

In the Indian Army, a further promotion to major followed in September 1926. He was later promoted to lieutenant colonel in September 1934, prior to retiring in March 1939. Pocock died at Bristol in August 1971. His son was the businessman Michael Pocock.
