= Lancelot Lawton =

English journalist (1880–1947)

- Born: Lancelot Francis Lawton; 28 December 1880; Liverpool, England
- Died: June 1947 (aged 66); Cambridge, England
- Education: St Francis Xavier's College
- Occupations: Military officer; historian; Ukrainist; activist; political journalist

Lancelot Francis Lawton (28 December 1880 (Note: Other dates given are 1881 and March 1881) – September 1947) was a British historian, military officer, scholar of Ukrainian studies, activist, and international political journalist who reported from Japan and the Soviet Union. He authored books about the Russian Revolution and the economic history of Soviet Russia. In the early 1930s, he contributed to the formation of pro-Ukrainian public opinion in the British society with his reports and articles about Ukraine. He was one of the founders and active participants in the Anglo-Ukrainian Committee established in 1935.

== Life and career ==
Lawton was born in Liverpool. He studied at the St Francis Xavier Jesuit college of his hometown. With the outbreak of the Russo-Japanese War broke out, he moved to Tokyo, reporting for The Daily Telegraph.

Lancelot wrote a column Foreign Politics of the Day in the Catholic periodical Dublin Review, beginning in 1911.

Lawton lived in Russia before the First World War, and visited again in 1924. Based on his experiences and collection of information, and assisted by his wife, Lydia Alexandrovna, who had graduated in political economy and commerce in Saint Petersburg, he published a book The Russian Revolution, 1917–1926 in 1927. It was intended for the general reader, not only for specialists. In the same spirit, he published another book, An Economic History of Soviet Russia in 1932, again assisted by his wife.

=== Pro-Ukrainian activism ===
In the early 1930s, he contributed to the formation of pro-Ukrainian public opinion in the British society with his reports and articles about Ukraine. In 1935, he addressed a committee of the House of Commons in London, beginning: "The chief problem in Europe to-day is the Ukrainian problem", expanding that the nationality of Ukraine had been suppressed by mighty neighbours. He urged Great Britain to support the Ukrainian movement for independence, and was one of the founders and active participants in the Anglo-Ukrainian Committee established in 1935.

Lawton also was involved, or on the fringes of, the British Fascist leadership. He attended a meeting at 129 Grosvenor Road, London on 9th November 1939. Other attendees included Barry Domvile, Lady Domvile, Neil Francis Hawkins, and Lord Lymington. There were hints from Oswald Mosley in the days running up that the British Union of Fascists would be the focal point of an underground movement, or that it would be put at the disposal of leading lights of Hitlerites and antisemites at the meeting.

Lawton died in Cambridge in September 1947, at age 66.

== Legacy ==
Some of Lancelot's articles about the status of Ukraine in the 1930s were collected in a book by the Ukrainian historian Serhiy Kot, and published in 2006 in London and Kyiv as Lancelot Lawton, Ukrainian Question. Ланцелот Лоутон Украiнське питання. Kot spent two years tracing Lawton's original articles, held by the Library of Congress in the U.S.
