= Ulbo de Sitter (sociologist) =

Dutch sociologist

Lamoraal Ulbo de Sitter (April 2, 1930 – December 18, 2010) was a Dutch sociologist and Professor of Business Administration at the Radboud University Nijmegen, known for his seminal work in the field of sociotechnical systems in the Netherlands.

== Biography ==
Born in Jönköping, Sweden, Ulbo de Sitter was named after his father Ulbo de Sitter (1902–1980), a geologist working at the Leiden University. Ulbo, the sociologist, was the grandson of astronomer Willem de Sitter (1872-1934). He studied sociology at the University of Amsterdam, and obtained his PhD in 1970 at the University of Leiden with the thesis, entitled "Leiderschapsvorming en leiderschapsgedrag in een organisatie" (Leadership formation and leadership behavior in an organization).

De Sitter had started working as engineer in the merchant navy for four years before he started his studies in Amsterdam. After graduation in Amsterdam he worked as sociologist at the head office of the Koninklijke PTT Nederland, nowadays KPN. Sequentially he was research assistant at the Sociografische Werkgemeenschap (Socio Graphic Work Association) of the University of Amsterdam. In 1971, he was appointed professor at Eindhoven University of Technology. From 1986 to 1988 he was also director of the Koers consulting group in 's-Hertogenbosch. In 1990, he was appointed Professor of Sociotechnical System at the University of Nijmegen, where he retired March 31, 1995.

== Work ==
De Sitter is best known for introducing the sociotechnical system approach in the Netherlands. This approach involves redesign of organization and change management theory, which was initially developed at the British Tavistock Institute in the late 1950s. De Sitter combined in his work the systems theory fundamentals of the Delft Systems Approach, developed by Jan in 't Veld and Pierre Malotaux. With scientists as Björn Gustavsen, Fred Emery, Eric Trist, De Sitter is considered among the foremost social systems scientists in their field.

=== Modern socio-technology (MST) ===
Benders et al. (2010) recalled the development of socio-technical systems design since its initiation at the British coal mines in the late 1940s, and the development of Modern Socio-technology (MST) by De Sitter and others:

In 1951, Trist and Bamforth published a founding article on STSD while the London-based Tavistock Institute played a key role in further developing socio-technical design into practical applications. During the 1950s and 1960s these notions were picked up in many countries, with Norwegian and Swedish researchers playing key roles. In the Netherlands a strand of socio-technical scholars and practitioners developed a widely accepted research based organizational design methodology (De Sitter, Den Hertog, & Dankbaar, 1997; De Sitter, 1998). This Dutch variant, called Modern Socio-technology (MST), builds on the classic STSD. In the 1970s Ulbo de Sitter played a key role in developing this socio-technical systems theory (with some roots in German sociology). During the 1980s this design theory was enriched with a proper design methodology based on action research...

And furthermore specifically about Modern Socio-technology (MST):

Modern Socio-technology (MST) mainly differs from STSD by its integral approach. Whereas classic STSD provides a set of static and partial design principles, MST offers detailed structural principles in terms of design content, while at the same time specifying a theory of change by means of worker participation and training (Van Eijnatten, 1993). To emphasize the integral character of this approach, Van Eijnatten and Van der Zwaan (1998) labeled it Integral Organizational Renewal (IOR).

== Selected publications ==
- Sitter, LU de. Op weg naar nieuwe fabrieken en kantoren. Produktieorganisatie en arbeidsorganisatie op de tweesprong. Deventer: Kluwer (1981).
- De Sitter, Lamoraal U. Synergetisch produceren. Uitgeverij Van Gorcum, 1998.

Articles, a selection:

- Sitter, LU de. "Moderne sociotechniek." Gedrag en organisatie 2.4/5 (1989): 222-252.
- De Sitter, L. Ulbo, J. Friso Den Hertog, and Ben Dankbaar. "From complex organizations with simple jobs to simple organizations with complex jobs." Human relations 50.5 (1997): 497-534.
