= Jeroen van der Veer =

Dutch businessman (born 1947)

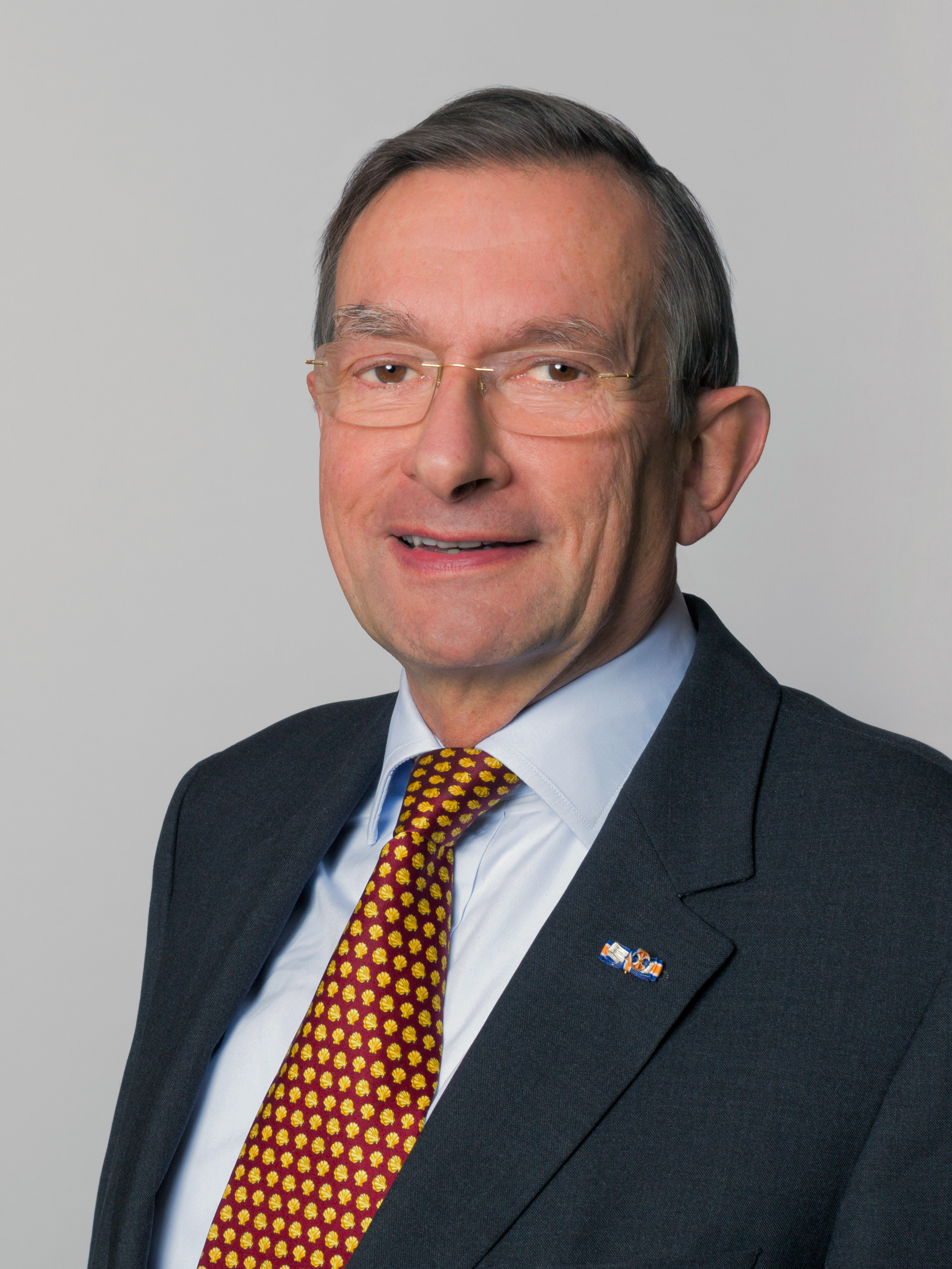
- van der Veer, 2015
- Born: October 27, 1947 (age 78); Utrecht, Netherlands
- Education: Delft University of Technology; Erasmus University Rotterdam
- Occupation: Businessman
- Title: Former chairman, Philips
- Spouse: Mariette
- Children: 3

Jeroen van der Veer (born 27 October 1947) is a Dutch businessman. He was the chairman of Philips, and previously a chief executive officer (CEO) of Royal Dutch Shell.

== Education ==
Jeroen van der Veer graduated in 1971 from the Delft University of Technology with an engineer's degree in mechanical engineering under Jan in 't Veld, where he had been teaching assistant with prof Pierre Malotaux. He went on to earn a master's degree in economics from Erasmus University Rotterdam. In 2005, he was awarded an honorary doctorate from the University of Port Harcourt in Nigeria.

== Career ==
Jeroen van der Veer joined Shell in 1971 and worked in manufacturing and marketing in the Netherlands, Curaçao and the United Kingdom.

In 2004, he succeeded to Phil Watts as the CEO of Royal Dutch Shell Group.

In March 2007 it was announced that Mr. van der Veer's contract as CEO would be extended to June 2009 some twenty months beyond his normal retirement date of October 2007. He was the first executive director of Shell to stay in office beyond the age of 60. He retired as chief executive of Royal Dutch Shell June 2009, and remains on the board of directors. He also is a non-executive director of Unilever and chairman of Platform Bèta Techniek (which organized the 2010 Science & Technology Summit in The Hague, which had Neil Armstrong and Steve Wozniak as keynote speakers, an event which Van der Veer headlined).

In 2009, van der Veer was appointed a member of the supervisory board of Philips. In May 2021, Van der Veer was succeeded by Feike Sijbesma as chairman of the supervisory board of Philips.

In October 2015, van der Veer was appointed honorary global chairman of London Speaker Bureau, with whom he is also a speaker. In May 2019, van der Veer was appointed as a member in the board of directors of Prorsum, a Swiss sustainable investment advisor.

== Personal life ==
Jeroen van der Veer is married to Mariette and has three daughters.

== Honours ==
A Royal honour was conferred upon van der Veer to mark his retirement in 2009. He has been appointed by the Queen of the Netherlands as a Commander in the Order of Orange-Nassau. In 2010 Jeroen van der Veer was presented with Singapore's Honorary Citizen Award by President S.R. Nathan at a ceremony held in Singapore on 25 February 2010. The Honorary Citizen Award is the highest form of recognition for outstanding contributions to the country's growth and development.

Business positions
Preceded by Philip Watts	Chairman of the Committee of Managing Directors of Royal Dutch Shell; 2004–2005	Succeeded by position of CEO of Royal Dutch Shell created
Preceded by position of CEO of Royal Dutch Shell created	Chief Executive Officer of Royal Dutch Shell; 2005–2009	Succeeded by Peter Voser
Preceded by Maarten van den Bergh	President-Director of Royal Dutch Petroleum Company; 2000–2005	Succeeded by Position dissolved July 2005 responsibilities split between CEO Royal Dutch Shell: Jeroen van der Veer; and Chairman (Non-Exec) Royal Dutch Shell: Aad Jacobs
