= Babysitter (disambiguation) =

A babysitter is one who temporarily cares for a child.

Babysitter(s) or baby sitter or babysitting may also refer to:

== Film ==
- The Babysitter (1969 film), an American exploitation film
- The Babysitter, an alternate title for the 1975 film Wanted: Babysitter
- The Babysitter (1980 film), an ABC TV thriller film starring William Shatner
- The Babysitter (1995 film), a psychological thriller starring Alicia Silverstone
- The Babysitters, a 2007 indie drama starring Katherine Waterston
- Babysitting (film), a 2014 French comedy film directed by and starring Philippe Lacheau
- Babysitter, a 2014 film by Morgan Krantz which screened at the 2015 Deauville American Film Festival
- The Babysitter (2017 film), an American horror film starring Judah Lewis and Samara Weaving
- Babysitter (2022 film), a Canadian comedy drama by Monia Chokri

== Television ==
- "The Baby-Sitter", episode two of Crime with Father, 1951
- "The Baby-Sitter", a 1957 episode of The Vise
- "The Baby Sitters", a 1958 episode of Fury (American)
- "The Baby Sitter", a 1959 episode of The Rifleman
- "The Baby Sitters", a 1960 episode of Hancock's Half Hour
- "The Baby Sitter", episode sixteen of Love and Marriage (1959), 1960
- "The Babysitters", a 1960 episode of The Flintstones
- "The Baby Sitter", episode twenty-two of Miami Undercover, 1961
- "The Baby Sitters", a 1961 episode of The Brothers Brannagan
- "The Baby Sitters", a 1962 episode of Adventures in Paradise
- "The Babysisters", a 1963 episode of The Patty Duke Show
- "The Baby Sitters", a 1966 episode of The Sooty Show
- "The Baby Sitters", a 1968 episode of Family Affair
- "Babysitter", a 1969 episode of Sabrina the Teenage Witch
- "The Babysitters", a 1970 episode of The Brady Bunch
- "Baby-sitter", a 1974 episode of Barbapapa
- "Babysitter", a 1976 episode of The Cuckoo Waltz
- "The Baby Sitters", a 1978 episode of Three's Company
- "The Baby-Sitters", a 1981 episode of The Amazing Adventures of Morph
- "The Babysitters", episode five of Condo, 1983
- "Babysitting", a 1983 episode of Happy Days
- "Babysitting", a 1984 episode of Yeh Jo Hai Zindagi
- "The Babysitters", a 1985 episode of Silver Spoons
- "Babysitting", a 1986 episode of The Elephant Show
- "The Babysitter", a 1986 episode of Who's the Boss?
- "The Babysitter", episode fifty-nine of Dinosaucers, 1987
- "The Babysitters", a 1988 episode of Wowser
- "The Babysitters" (Saved by the Bell), a 1990 episode
- "The Babysitter", a 1991 episode of The Upper Hand
- "The Babysitter", episode ten of Laurie Hill, produced 1992 (unaired)
- "Babysitting", a 1993 episode of Clarissa Explains It All
- "Baby Sitter", a 1995 episode of G.P.
- "Babysitting", a 1995 episode of The Single Guy
- "Babysitting" (Beavis and Butt-head), a 1996 episode
- "Baby Sitter", episode one of Romuald the Reindeer, 1996
- "Babysitting", a 1997 episode of Gogs
- "Baby-Sitting", episode four of Orleans, 1997
- "The Babysitter" (Cow and Chicken), a 1998 episode
- "Babysitting", a 1999 episode of The Naked Chef
- "Baby Sitting", a 2003 episode of Ed
- "The Babysitter" (Frasier), a 2003 episode
- "Babysitting", a 2004 episode of Oliver Beene
- "Babysitting", a 2004 episode of Peppa Pig
- "Babysitter", a 2006 episode of Harvey Birdman, Attorney at Law
- "The Babysitter", a 2006 episode of My Parents Are Aliens
- "The Babysitters", a 2007 episode of Sea Princesses
- "Baby Sitter", episode eighty of Que du bonheur!, 2008
- "Babysitter", a 2014 episode of Sendokai Champions
- "Babysitting", a 2016 episode of Loosely Exactly Nicole
- "Babysitting" (Not Going Out), a 2017 episode
- Babysitter (TV series), a 2016 South Korean drama series

== Music ==
- The Baby Sitters (folk group), a children's music group that started in 1958 and included member Alan Arkin
- Baby Huey & the Babysitters, an American music group founded in 1963
- "Baby Sitter" (song), a song by American rapper DaBaby

== Other ==
- The Babysitter (short story), 1969 short story by Robert Coover
- The Babysitter, a 1989 novel by Ed Gorman, written as Daniel Ransom
- The Babysitter (novel series), by R. L. Stine initially published from 1989 to 1995
- Babysitter (Oates novel), 2022 novel by Joyce Carol Oates
- The Babysitter, a nickname for the Oakland County Child Killer

== See also ==
- The Baby-Sitters Club, a series of novels written by Ann M. Martin
- Adventures in Babysitting (1987 film)
- Adventures in Babysitting (2016 film)
