= Denis Rooke =

English businessman

Sir Denis Eric Rooke OM CBE FRS FREng
- Born: 2 April 1924; 42 Erlanger Road, New Cross, London, England
- Died: 2 September 2008 (aged 84); Greenwich and Bexley Cottage Hospice, Abbey Wood, London, England
- Education: University College London, England
- Occupations: North Thames Gas Board: work on reforming processes and liquefied natural gas Gas Council: North Sea gas development British Gas Corporation: chairman (1976 to 1989)
- Board member of: Gas Council, British Gas Corporation, British Gas plc
- Spouse: Elizabeth Brenda Evans
- Children: 1

Sir Denis Eric Rooke OM CBE FRS FREng (2 April 1924 – 2 September 2008) was an English industrialist and engineer.

== Early life ==
Denis Eric Rooke was born in New Cross, London, the younger son of Frederick George Rooke, a printer and travelling salesman, and his wife Ada Emily née Brown. He attended Westminster City School and Addey and Stanhope School before studying mechanical engineering at University College London, taking a first-class degree in 1944. He then served in REME in Britain and India until 1949, attaining the rank of major.

He studied for a postgraduate diploma in chemical engineering at University College which he was awarded in 1949. He married Elizabeth Brenda Evans (1922-2017?) on 22 January 1949 in Deptford, London.She was an investigator providing research services, and they had a daughter, Diana.

== Career ==
From 1949 he worked in the gas industry, first on coal tar by-products at the South Metropolitan Gas works where he was appointed deputy manager of the tar works in 1954. He was seconded to North Thames Gas in 1957 to work on reforming processes for producing town gas from natural gas and oil. He also worked on liquefied natural gas (LNG), pioneering the sea transport of LNG. He was aboard the ship, the Methane Pioneer, making the first delivery to Canvey Island of LNG to the UK in 1959.

Rooke joined the board of the Gas Council in 1966 as the member for production and supplies, with responsibility for developing gas fields. His greatest achievement was to help to bring natural gas from the North Sea to domestic, commercial and industrial premises across Britain. This entailed the conversion of all gas appliance and the construction of a network of high pressure pipelines. He claimed this was "perhaps the biggest peacetime operation in the nation's history".

He became deputy chairman of the Gas Council in 1972 and, along with the chairman, Sir Henry Jones, and Sir Arthur Hetherington, he was responsible for combining the Gas Council and 12 separate gas boards into the British Gas Corporation in 1973.

Rooke was appointed chairman of the British Gas Corporation in 1976. He was involved in several controversies. The Gas Council had formed a consortium to search for, and produce, offshore gas. At the same time, it was responsible for buying gas produced by other companies. The companies insisted on a market value approach to prices whereas the Gas Council purchased, more cheaply, gas priced on cost. The incoming Conservative government in 1979 wished to reform the nationalised industries. The government insisted that British Gas divest itself of oil exploration and production interests.

This was achieved through the establishment of Enterprise Oil. In 1986, British Gas was floated on the stock market; Rooke had insisted that British Gas should be privatised as an integrated entity. However, it was soon divided into three parts: Centrica, BG Group and Lattice. Rooke remained chairman until he retired in 1989.

== Honours and appointments ==
- Appointed a CBE in 1970, and knighted in 1977.
- Appointed to the Order of Merit in 1997.
- Fellow of University College London 1972.
- Honorary degree (DSc) from the University of Leeds, 1980
- Chancellor of Loughborough University from 1989 to 2003 and a building was named after him.
- Awarded in 1987 an honorary degree (Doctor of Laws) from the University of Bath.
- Fellow of the Royal Society 1978. Awarded Rumford Medal 1986.
- Chairman of the Council for National Academic Awards 1978 to 1983.
- President Royal Academy of Engineering 1986 to 1991. Awarded Prince Philip Medal 1992.
- President, British Association for the Advancement of Science, 1990-1991
- Trustee of the Science Museum 1983 to 1995, Chairman 1995.

== Death ==
Denis Rooke died of cancer on 2 September 2008. Lady Rooke died in 2017.

Academic offices
Preceded by Sir Arnold Hall	Chancellor of Loughborough University; 1989–2003	Succeeded by Sir John Jennings
