= Barthold Theodoor Willem van Hasselt =

Dutch business executive (1896–1960)

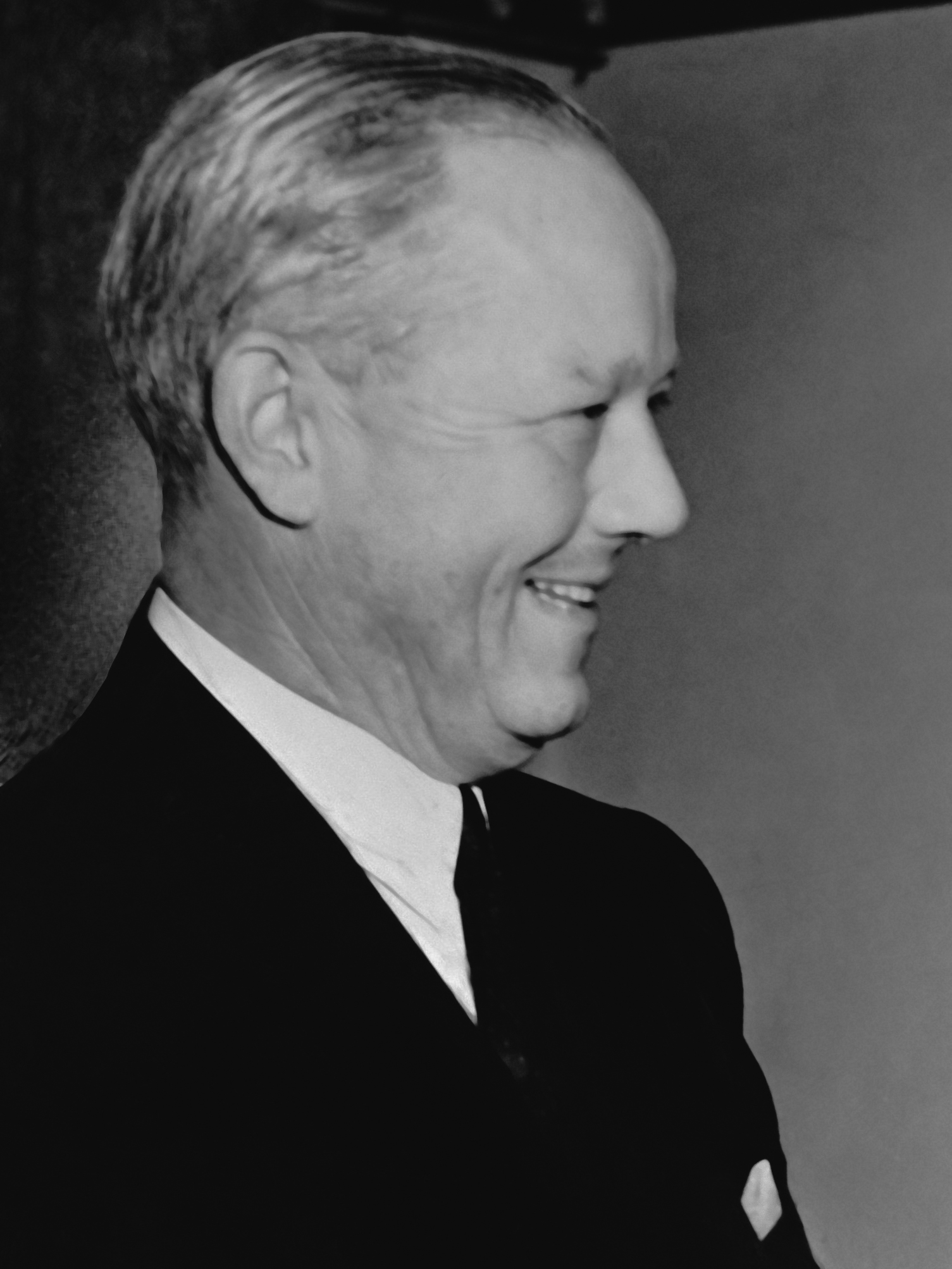
Barthold Theodoor Willem van Hasselt in 1948

Barthold Theodoor Willem van Hasselt (7 November 1896, Leiden - 5 August 1960, Wassenaar) was a Dutch business executive in the Dutch East Indies and the chief executive of Royal Dutch Shell from 1949 to 1951.

== Family ==
Van Hasselt was the son of Marie Elise Prins (1875-1949) and the physician Sjoerd Folkert Willem van Hasselt (1868-1934). He married Elisabeth Henriette Versteegh (1898-1957) in 1920 and Marion Elizabeth Davidson (1892-1992) in 1938. From the first marriage two daughters were born: Anna Margaretha van Hasselt (1922-1931) and Elisabeth Henriette van Hasselt (1927-2014). The last married Albert Paul Friedrich Freiherr von Westenholz (1921-2011) in 1951, married the actor Albert Vogel jr. (1924-1982) in 1960, and finally the architect Rutger Dirk Bleeker (1920-2016) in 1988; she is the mother of art historian Caroline de Westenholz (born 1954).

== Career ==
Van Hasselt studied law at Leiden and graduated in 1919. He then became head official of the Royal Dutch Society for the exploitation of petroleum resources in the Dutch East Indies. Then he became chief representative of the Bataafse Petroleum Maatschappij. As of January 1934, he was a banker and second deputy director at the Javasche Bank. On 28 December 1933 he was also appointed a member of the Volksraad (Dutch East Indies) and for years he was a member of the so-called Economic Group. In 1938 Van Hasselt became general director of the Mexican Eagle Petroleum Company, where the Royal Dutch Shell interests were accommodated. In 1944 he was appointed director of the Royal Dutch Society for the exploitation of petroleum resources in the Dutch East Indies and in 1949 as Director General of the "Royal" from Shell, as successor to the son of Shell-founder Guus Kessler (1888- 1972); at the end of 1951 he resigned as CEO of Shell. He then held various supervisory positions, like at Akzo and Hoogovens and was Chairman of the Supervisory Board of Billiton.

== Distinctions ==
- Bronze Medal for humanitarian hulpbetoon (1919)
- Kings medal (1949)
- Knight of the Order of the Dutch Lion (1950)
- Commander in the Order of Orange-Nassau (1952)
- Honorary member of the Society of Commerce and Industry (1960)

== Bibliography ==
The literature on the draft law on the Nameless Companies critically summarized . Leiden, 1919 ( thesis ).

== Sources ==
- W. Wijnaendts of Resandt, history and genealogy of the Cleefsch Zutphen Serbian family Van Hasselt ± 1530-1934 . [Zp], 1934, p. 323.
- W. Wijnaendts of Resandt, history and genealogy of the Cleefsch Zutphen Serbian family Van Hasselt ± 1530-1963 . [Zp], 1963², p. 329-330.
- Inventory of the collections of the family association Van Hasselt, 2008
- Netherlands's Patriciaat 94 (2015), p. 250-252.

Business positions
Preceded by Guus Kessler	General Managing Director of Royal Dutch Petroleum Company; 1949–1951	Succeeded by Johan Hugo Loudon
Preceded by Guus Kessler	Chairman of the Committee of Managing Directors of Royal Dutch Shell; 1949–1951	Succeeded by Johan Hugo Loudon
