= Financial Services and Markets Tribunal =

British judicial body

The United Kingdom's Financial Services and Markets Tribunal was an independent judicial body established under Section 132 of the Financial Services and Markets Act 2000, which heard references arising from decision notices issued by the Financial Services Authority (FSA). In April 2010, the tribunal was abolished and its functions were transferred to the Upper Tribunal.

Examples of such decisions that the tribunal could review included:

- the giving, variation and revocation of authorisations to conduct regulated activities, or on the imposition of requirements for such authorisation (e.g. requirements for a firm to maintain a particular level of resources);
- penalties for market abuse, including civil penalties for insider dealing;
- disciplinary measures being taken against authorised persons who have failed to comply with regulatory requirements;
- decisions by the FSA in its role as a competent authority in relation to the listing of shares on recognised exchanges - for example, refusing to admit securities to the official list, suspending official listing of securities where necessary, and the imposition of penalties on issuers who breach listing rules; and
- the approval and discipline of employees and persons who carry out certain functions on behalf of authorised persons. There may prohibit certain persons, including professionals, from carrying out particular functions.

There were eight legally qualified chairmen (including the President, Stephen Oliver QC) and 19 lay members with special experience of the financial sector - all appointed by the Lord Chancellor. Appeal against decisions of the tribunal, on a point of law, reverted to the Court of Appeal in England and Wales, and to the Court of Session in Scotland.
