= Maarten van den Bergh =

Dutch businessman

Maarten Albert van den Bergh
- Born: 19 April 1942 (age 83); New York City, United States
- Citizenship: Dutch
- Occupation: Businessman
- Years active: c. 1970–2011
- Employer: Royal Dutch Shell (32 years)
- Known for: President-Director of Royal Dutch Petroleum Company; Chairman of Lloyds TSB

Maarten Albert van den Bergh (born 19 April 1942 in New York City) is a Dutch businessman.

== Early life ==
Van den Bergh is the son of Maria Meijers (1905–1957) and Sidney James van den Bergh, long-term chairman of Unilever and Dutch Minister of Defense in 1959. His grandfather Samuel van den Bergh was one of the founders of Unilever.

== Career ==
Van den Bergh spent 32 years at the multinational oil company Shell (also previously known as the "Royal Dutch / Shell Group"), where he rose to non-executive president of the "Royal Dutch Petroleum Company", one of the two parent companies (with "The Shell Transport and Trading Company") of the "Royal Dutch / Shell Group", and to vice-president (an executive position) of the committee of the managing directors of the "Royal Dutch / Shell Group". In 2001, he left Shell to become chairman of Lloyds TSB, a financial services company based in the United Kingdom.

=== Board memberships ===
- Member of the Supervisory Board at Akzo Nobel NV starting in 2005; Deputy Chairman of Supervisory Board until May 2006; Chairman of Akzo Nobel's Supervisory Board from May 2006 to February 2009.
- Deputy Chairman of BT Group Plc from 1 October 2006 to 15 July 2009; Non-Executive Director of BT Group Plc from 1 September 2000 to 15 July 2009; Non-Executive Director of British Telecom.
- Vice Chairman of the Committee of Managing Directors of Royal Dutch/Shell Group of companies from 1998 to 2000;
  - Member of Supervisory Board of Royal Dutch Shell plc from 2000 to 4 July 2005; Non-Executive Director of Royal Dutch Shell Plc since October 2004
  - Non-Executive Director of Royal Dutch Petroleum Company and served as its Member of the Supervisory Board since 2000.
- Deputy Chairman of Lloyds Banking Group plc since 2000; Director of Lloyds TSB Bank Plc until 11 May 2006.
- Independent Non-executive Director or International Consolidated Airlines Group, S.A. from July 2002 to January 2011
- Non-Executive Director of Lloyds Banking Group plc from 2000 to May 2006

In 2005, The Times named him the most powerful businessman in Great Britain.

Business positions
Preceded by Cor Herkströter	President-Director of Royal Dutch Petroleum Company; 1998–2000	Succeeded by Jeroen van der Veer
