= Cor Herkströter =

Dutch oil industry executive (1937–2026)

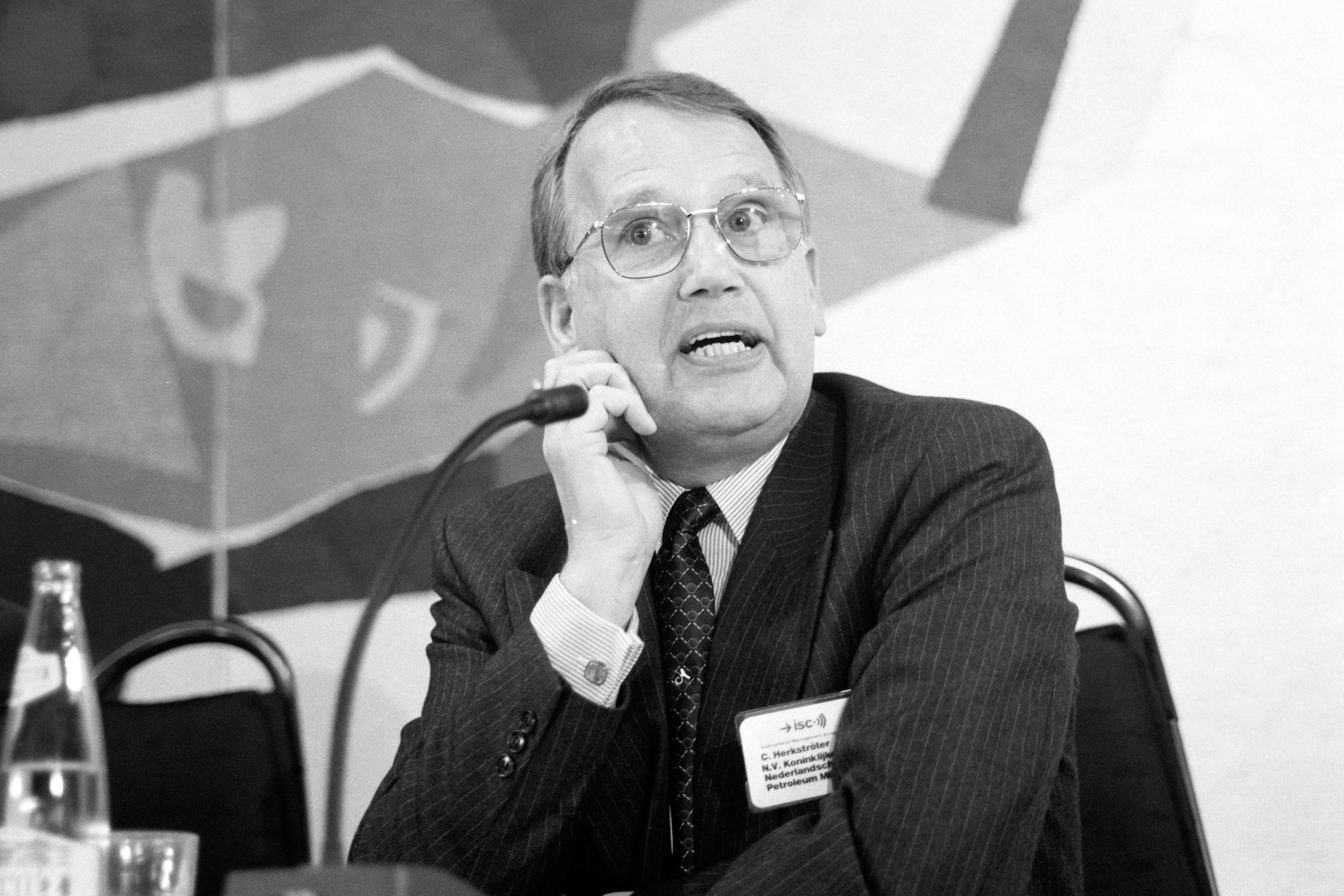
Herkströter in 1993

Antonius Johannes Cornelius Herkströter (21 August 1937 – 4 June 2026) was a Dutch oil industry executive who was chairman of Royal Dutch Shell.

== Life and career ==
Cor Herkströter was born in Venlo on 21 August 1937. He studied economics and accountancy at the School of Economics in Rotterdam (now Erasmus University Rotterdam). After graduating, he joined Billiton mining company which was latterly taken over by Shell. During his career at Shell he rose to the most senior executive position at the company, the Chairman of the Committee of Managing Directors, on 1 July 1993.

In 1996, he reorganized the central offices in The Hague and London and laboratories in Amsterdam and Rijswijk. He retired in 1998.

After his tenure at Royal Dutch Shell, he became President Commissioner of the ING Group.

Herkströter died on 4 June 2026, at the age of 88.

Business positions
Preceded by Peter Fenwick Holmes	Chairman of the Committee of Managing Directors of Royal Dutch Shell; 1993–1998	Succeeded by Mark Moody-Stuart
Preceded by Lo van Wachem	President-Director of Royal Dutch Petroleum Company; 1992–1998	Succeeded by Maarten van den Bergh
