= House sitter =

House sitter may refer to:

- Someone who guards a house by house sitting
- Housesitter, a 1992 comedy film starring Steve Martin and Goldie Hawn
