= Jan in 't Veld =

Dutch engineer (1925–2005)

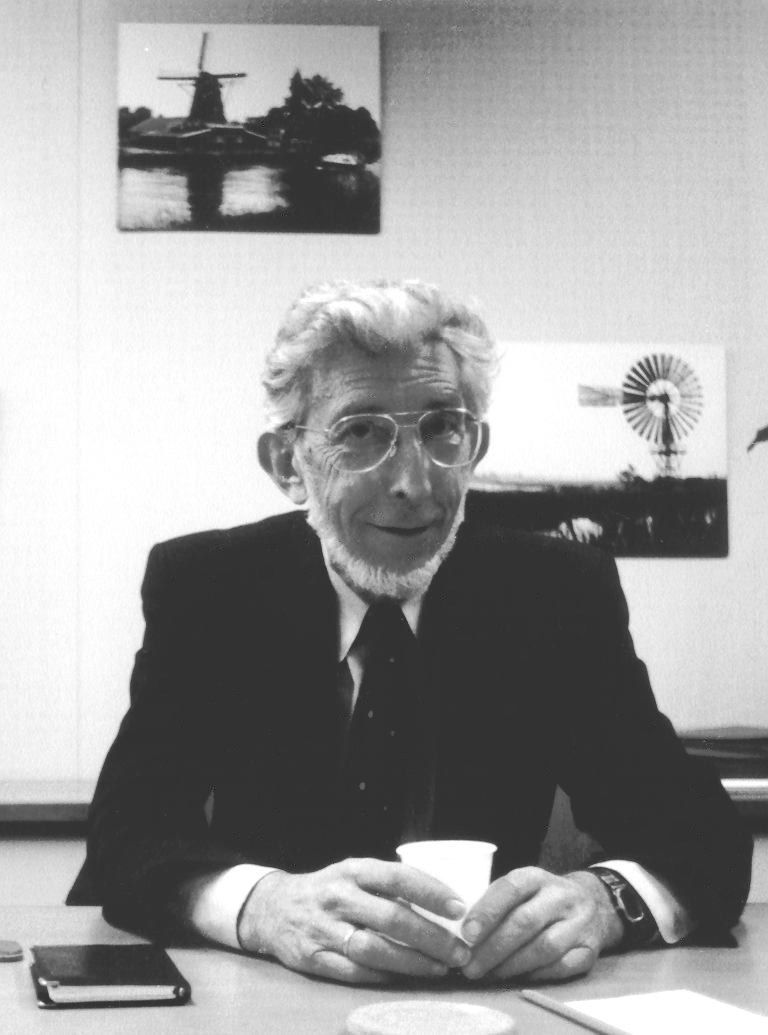
Jan in 't Veld, TU Delft 1991

Jan in 't Veld (16 December 1925 – 27 January 2005) was a Dutch aerospace engineer and professor of industrial organization at the Mechanical Engineering Department of the Technical University of Delft. In the Netherlands he was one of the pioneers of the application of systems theory in business administration and management.

== Biography ==
Born in Rotterdam to Joris in 't Veld, former minister and one of the founders of the management sciences in the Netherlands, In 't Veld studied aeronautical engineering at the Technical University of Delft from 1945 to May 1951. He received his Engineering Degree with a thesis on strength calculations .

In 1950 In 't Veld joined Fokker, where he worked as production manager at the Fokker F-27. From 1963 to 1968 he was production director, and directed the production of the Fokker F28. From 1968 to 1993 he was Professor of Industrial Organisation at the Faculty of Mechanical Engineering and the Faculty of Aerospace Engineering at the Delft University of Technology. Together with Pierre Malotaux he developed a specific system approach to organizational problems, called the Delft Systems Approach. After his emeritation In 't Veld is succeeded by Henk Bikker, who held his inauguration speech May 1995.

In 't Veld has held several directorships, including at Oldelft (now Thales Group), Ferro Holland and Gouda Refractories. From 1976 to 1992 he was also a citizen curator of the Royal Military Academy in Breda, and from 1993 to 2000 he was program leader of the TSM Business School. In 1990 he received the Conrad's Premium of the Koninklijk Instituut Van Ingenieurs (KIVI), for his contributions to the engineering sciences and their application. In 2003 he received BAAA Award of the KIVI NIRIA division of Business Administration, and in 2004 they appointed him honorable member.

In 't Veld was married to the sociologist Henny Langeveld (1926–2004) Emeritus Professor of Equality Studies at the Erasmus University Rotterdam. He was a lifelong avid photographer of Dutch windmills. He died in Leiden on 27 January 2005.

Notable former students were Jeroen van der Veer of Shell, Gertjan Kroon of GVB Amsterdam, Jan Zaaijer former Fokker and BBA (public transport), and Bernard Dijkhuizen of Ziggo. Also Jan Bots, professor at Nyenrode Business University, Klaas Smit, former professor Maintenance Engineering at TU Delft, the inventor of the venturi turbine Rikus van der Klippe, management author Hessel Visser and research assistant L.J. (Hans) Lekkerkerk were among its alumni.

== Work ==
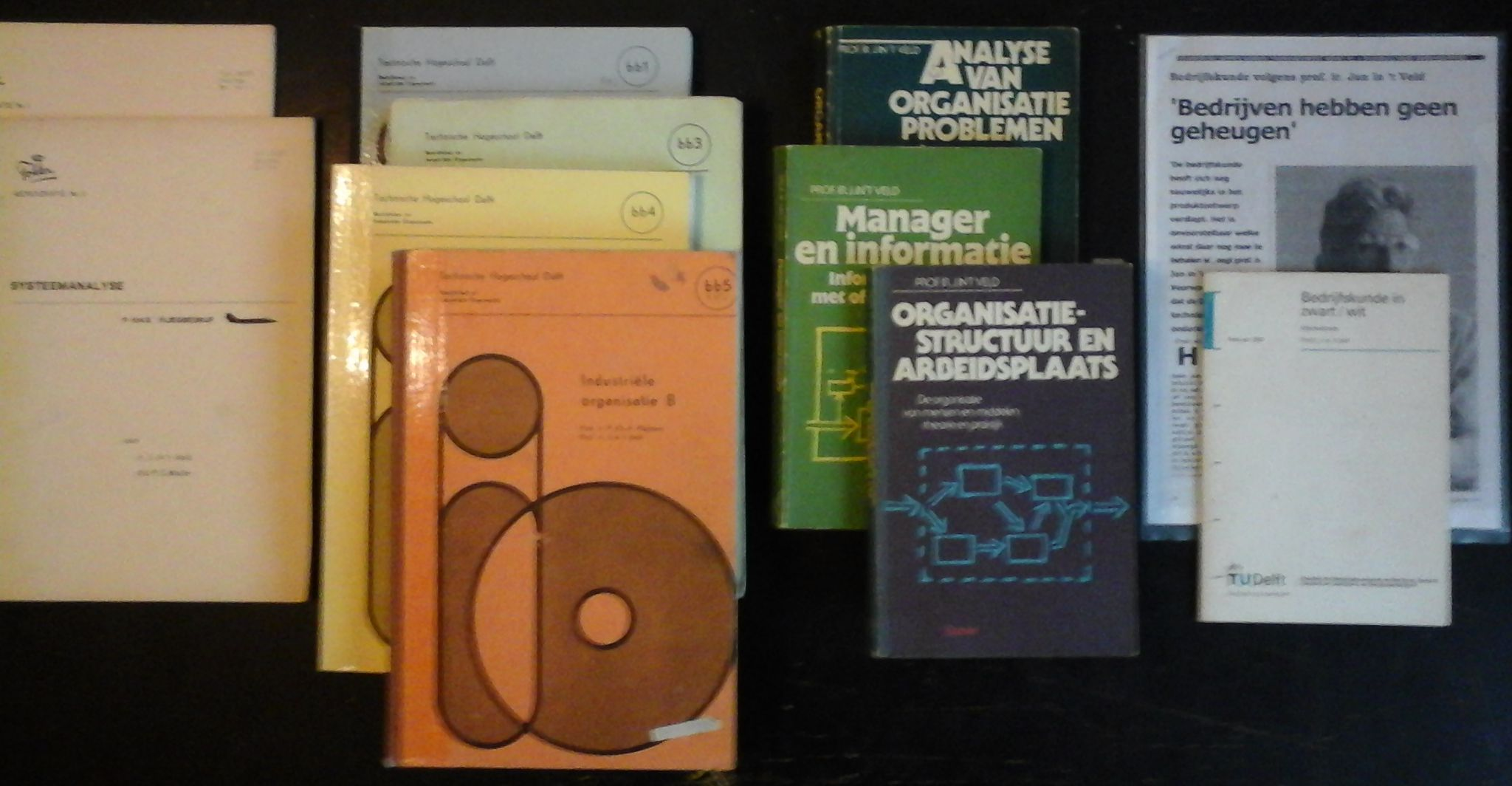
Works of Jan in 't Veld from 1965 to 1994

In 't Veld research interests, where in the fields of systems approach to organizational problems, industrial organization and management and information. He was one of the pioneers of the application of systems theory in business administration and management, which he and others developed into the so-called Delft Systems Approach, or the Delft School of Business Administration. His "Analyse van organisatieproblemen" (Analysis of organizational problems) was published in eight editions between 1975 and 2002. His works has been further developed in the field of Sociotechnical system by Ulbo de Sitter.

=== Systems concepts ===
In 't Veld made a specific effort in explaining and clarifying the language of the systems approach, and the different types of abstractions it holds. Key concepts are the system, elements, relations, reality, models, environment and process:

A system is, depending upon the objectives as defined by the analyst, a set of clearly distinguished elements within the total reality. These elements certainly have relations amongst themselves and may have relations with other elements of the total reality, where:

elements are the smallest entities that the 'analyst wishes to consider in his analysis;
relations are descriptions of the coherence between these elements.
Reality consists of an enormous number of elements and relations. Consequently, we tend to develop a concept or simplified construction so as to be able to manipulate, exercise and imitate, until the complicated reality becomes clear, understood and, preferably, controllable. These strategic aids, serving to order and analyse the chaos of information collected, are called models.

The environment of a system is defined as follows:

The environment of the system under consideration is composed by those elements of the universe which influence the characteristics or the values of these characteristics of the system elements, or, vice versa, are influenced by the system.

A process is defined as:

A process is a series of transformations during transit, due to which the input element changes in place, position, shape, size, function, property or any other characteristic.

=== The Delft Systems Approach ===
In 't Veld is one of the pioneers of the application of systems theory in business administration and management. With Pierre Malotaux and others he developed a specific system approach to organizational problems. In his 1975 "Analysis of organizational problems" In 't Veld explained, that for centuries managers have already thought in processes and systems, only they didn't call it like that. In the second part of the 20th century the systems approach has created a conceptual framework to work systematically and consciously. It is mainly a conceptual framework for own use. In presentation findings should be transferred equally well without system jargon.

The system approach "seeks to understand how they interact with one another and how they can be brought into proper relationship for the optimum solution of the problem." Practitioners should keep in mind, that systems thinking is not a panacea. It offers one particular "systematic way of thinking about problems, provides a better understanding and insight, and is a tool that can lead to a higher level of abstraction consider regarding concrete situations ... Threads with specialists from other disciplines can become clearer. Multidisciplinary work becomes easier."

=== Companies have no memory, 1994 ===
In a 1994 interview In 't Veld stated, that "Companies have no memory." According to In 't Veld.

Business theory has hardly incorporated product design. It is amazing what progress there is to achieve there yet... The management of many companies is exclusively in the hands of economists, and the lack of technical knowledge on the top level will work out disastrous. That's why I always have aimed to educated technicians, who know what organizing is about so that they can contribute to the top management. On the other end, what can a manager do on the workfloor if he does not grasps what is being created? Malotaux and I have always been convinced, that you must first understand the processes and methods before you can start organizing. A technical student must be able to choose a specialization in business in a later stage of his technical study...

In 't Veld was referring to Pierre Malotaux, with whom he had developed and supplied education in Business management at the Delft University of Technology since their inauguration in 1968.

== Selected publications ==
- 1965, Systeemanalyse : F-104G vliegbedrijf, ism P.C. Muller, Fokker monografie 2.
- 1967, Lijnproductie; theorie beleid gevolgen, ism P.H.M.G Janssen. Fokker monografie 6.
- 1969. Trio-logie: Variaties over een thema uit de bedrijfsleer. With Pierre Malotaux and Henk Lombaers.
- 1971, Bedrijfsinformatie; wie moet welke gegevens, waarom, wanneer en op welke wijze weten. TED, scientific supplement, no. 1.
- 1975, Analyse van organisatieproblemen: een toepassing van denken in systemen en processen, Amsterdam: Agon Elsevier.
- 1976, Arbeidsplaats en organisatie : verslag van inleiding en discussie gehouden op 16 November 1976, Den Haag: Ministerie van Binnenlandse Zaken.
- 1981, Organisatiestructuur en arbeidsplaats : de organisatie van mensen en middelen : theorie en praktijk, Amsterdam : Elsevier.
- 1986, Manager en informatie: informatiesystemen met of zonder computer, Amsterdam : Elsevier.
- 1993, Bedrijfskunde in zwart/wit, Technische Universiteit Delft, Faculteit der Werktuigbouwkunde en Maritieme Techniek, Afscheidsrede Technische Universiteit Delft.
- 2007, Analyse van bedrijfsprocessen : een toepassing van denken in systemen, with Marylse in 't Veld and Bé Slatius. Groningen : Wolters-Noordhoff.

Articles, a selection:

- Veld, J. in 't, "Models: A Systematic Classification." Management Research News, 9(1), 17 (1986).
- Veld, J.; Peeters, W. A. (1989). "Keeping large projects under control: the importance of contract type selection". International Journal of Project Management. 7 (3): 155–162. doi:10.1016/0263-7863(89)90034-3.
