= Ulbo de Sitter =

Dutch geologist (1902–1980)

- Born: Lamoraal Ulbo de Sitter; 6 March 1902; Groningen, Netherlands
- Died: 12 May 1980 (aged 78); Nistelrode, Netherlands
- Known for: structural geology
- Scientific career
- Fields: structural geology

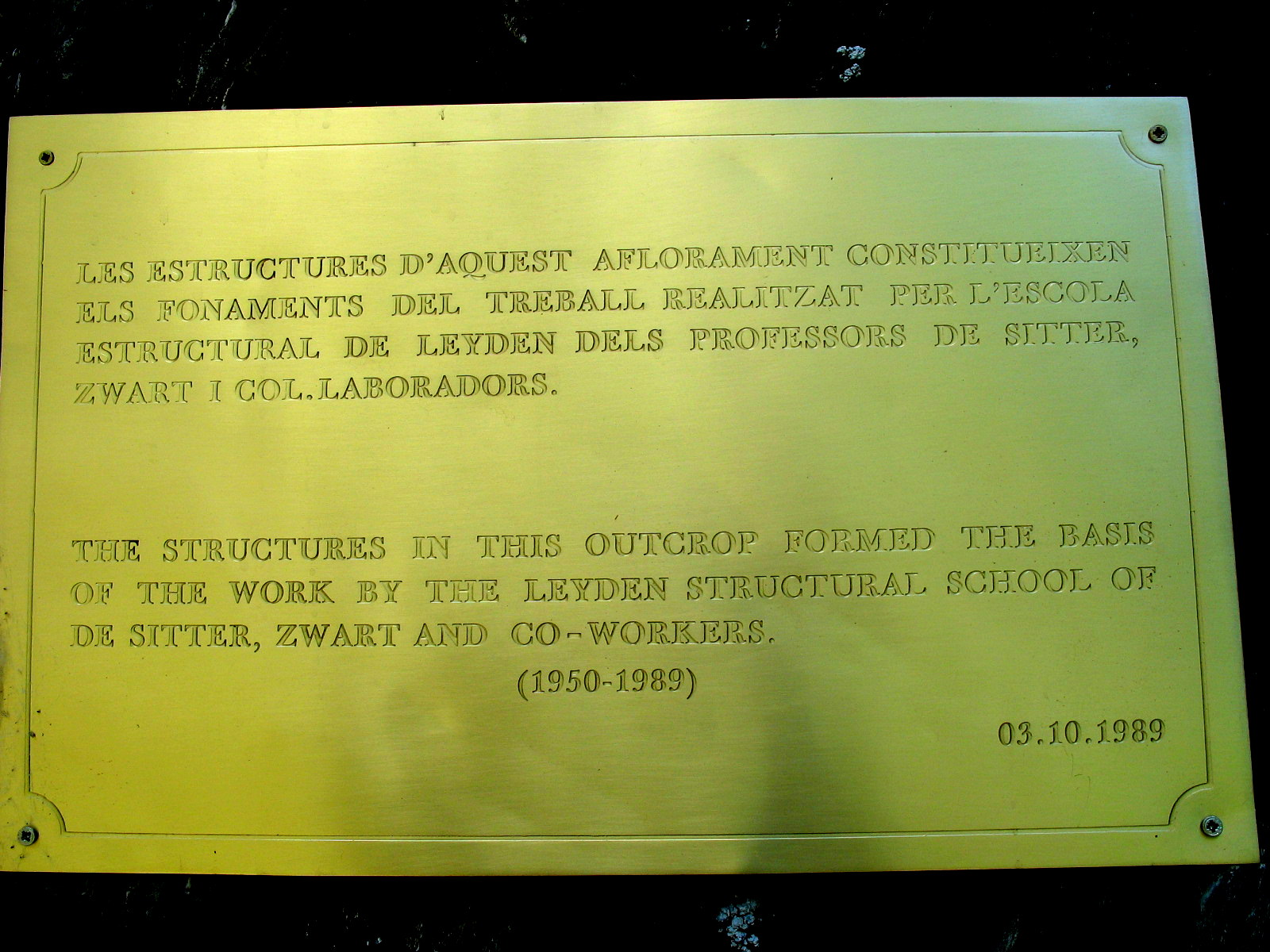
Memorial plaque for De Sitter and Leiden colleagues in the Pyrenees

Lamoraal Ulbo de Sitter (6 March 1902 – 12 May 1980) was a Dutch geologist at Leiden University, where he was the founder of the school of structural geology. De Sitter was known for his research on the geology of the Alps and Pyrenees. His father was the astronomer Willem de Sitter (1872–1934), and one of his sons was the Dutch sociologist Ulbo de Sitter (1930–2010).

== Life and Works ==
De Sitter studied geology in Switzerland and later at Leiden, where he was a pupil of geologists Karl Martin (1851–1942) and Berend George Escher (1885–1967). He finished his dissertation in 1925 and then got a job at Bataafse Petroleum Maatschappij.

After some years, he returned to Leiden to become Escher's assistant. De Sitter's task was to supervise fieldwork and research in the Bergamo Alps (northern Italy). In addition to mapping geological structures, De Sitter also did experimental research on the development and origin of geological structures such as faults or folds. He worked together on these experiments with Philip Henry Kuenen, an old friend from his student days who would later become a professor at Groningen.

The Second World War made research outside the Netherlands impossible for Dutch geologists. De Sitter and mining engineer W.A.J.M. van Waterschoot van der Gracht organised field studies of the subsurface of the southeastern part of the Netherlands. The students who participated were in this way excluded from forced labour for the Nazi authorities.

De Sitter started a geologic research program in the Pyrenees and Cantabria (both in northern Spain) after the war. The geological surveys by the Leiden students are in some cases still used by the Spanish geologic survey. De Sitter became a professor in 1948. His further research was mainly on similarities and relations between different small-scale geologic structures (such as boudins, schistocities or parasitary folds) and large-scale structures (such as folds and thrusts up to the scale of mountain ranges). His book Structural Geology was translated into many languages and used worldwide. In his later years at Leiden, his health prevented him from doing more field research, thus reducing his motivation. His method of putting all geologic observations into one large framework would be characteristic for the Leiden school of structural geology, which was continued under Henk Zwart after De Sitter's retirement in 1968.

In 1962, he became a member of the Royal Netherlands Academy of Arts and Sciences.

== Selected publications ==
- De Sitter, L. U. "Diagenesis of oil-field brines." AAPG Bulletin 31.11 (1947): 2030-2040.
- De Sitter, Lamoraal Ulbo, and Catharina Maria de SITTER-KOOMANS. The geology of the Bergamasc Alps, Lombardia, Italy. 1949.
- De Sitter, Lamoraal Ulbo, and L. U. Sitter. Structural geology. New York: McGraw-Hill, 1964.
- Zwart, Hendrik Jan, and L. U. De Sitter. The geology of the central Pyrenees. Geologisch en mineralogisch Instituut der Rijksuniversiteit, 1979.

Articles, a selection:

- De Sitter, L. U. "Diagenesis of oil-field brines." AAPG Bulletin 31.11 (1947): 2030-2040.
- De Sitter, L. U. "Boudins and parasitic folds in relation to cleavage and folding." Geologie en Mijnbouw 20 (1958): 277-286.
- De Sitter, L. U. "Structural development of the Arabian Shield in Palestine." Geol. Mijnbouw 41.3 (1962): 116-124.
