= De Sitter effect =

In astrophysics, the term de Sitter effect (named after the Dutch physicist Willem de Sitter) has been applied to two unrelated phenomena:

- De Sitter double star experiment
- De Sitter precession – also known as geodetic precession or the geodetic effect
