= Van der Vyver =

van der Vyver is an Afrikaans surname. Notable people with the surname include:

- Johan D. van der Vyver (born 1934), South African academic
- Syd van der Vyver (1920–1989), South African racing driver
- Wilhelm van der Vyver (born 1989), South African sprinter
