= Sendokai Champions =

- Genre: Action; Comedy; Adventure; Sport
- Created by: Kotoc
- Written by: Guillem Dols
- Directed by: Freddy Córdoba Schwanberg; Roger Córboda Schwanberg
- Voices of: Joshua Zamrycki; Molly Malcolm; Benjamin Nathan-Serio; Jenny Beacraft; Alex Warner; Faye Hadley; Robert Paterson; Mark Schardan; Nick Chapman
- Composer: Banjo Music
- Country of origin: Spain
- Original languages: English; Spanish; Catalan
- No. of seasons: 3
- No. of episodes: 55

Production
- Executive producer: David Diéguez Redondo
- Running time: 22 minutes (2 11-minute segments)
- Production companies: Kotoc Produccions; Televisión Española; Nottingham Forest

Original release
- Network: Clan TVE (Spain); Cartoon Network (Latin America); YouTube (United States)
- Release: April 2, 2013 – present

Sendokai Champions (known as Desafío Champions Sendokai in Spain) is a Spanish animated television series developed by Kotoc Produccions for Televisión Española. The series is created by Kotoc.

A second season was released in May 2014 on Cartoon Network. A third season began its production in January 2024 and the expectation is for the new season to release in 2026 (after Sengate Release). On September 25, 2025, the showrunners of Sendokai Champions announced the third season will come out on May 30, 2026 due to the finale of UEFA Champions League. The 53rd episode, called "Sendokai Sengate", set after the events of the second season finale, serves as a prologue for the third season and was released on May 31, 2025.

The series was originally planned to air in the United States on The CW's Vortexx block during the 2013–14 season. However, it never ended up scheduled before the block's end in September 2014. Instead, Sendokai Champions ended up premiering on YouTube. However, the episodes were unlisted but have since been reuploaded.

== Plot ==
Zak, Cloe, Kiet and Fenzy are four unpopular kids from Earth who are not very good at sports. One day they find bracelets that have the power to transport them to another dimension. There they meet Tänpo, the master, who explains that the Zorn Empire is about to conquer the Multiverse. The Earth is in danger and, if they want to save it, there is only one way: they will have to overcome their weaknesses, learn the art of Sendokai to become warriors, and win the Great Sendokai Tournament of the Multiverse.

== Characters ==
- Zak - Zak likes to be the center of attention.
- Cloe - Cloe is an intelligent and responsible girl.
- Kiet - Kiet is the laziest guy in the multiverse.
- Fenzy - Fenzy is quite a character: brave, proud, and sarcastic.
- Tänpo - Tänpo is the Sendokai master of the kids
- Lula - Lula is Tänpo's pet and his only companion
- Sidmodius - Minister Sidmodius would do anything for the Zorn... or so he says.
- Lalith - Lalith is a commander of the Zorn empire but then she redeems.
- Kazkrad - Kazkrad is the other Zorn commander.
- Kento/Marshal Zorn - The Marshal is the leader of the Zorn and directs the empire with an iron fist, conquering all dimensions in its path but then he redeems himself.
- Lon - Lon joins the group in season 2, and quickly becomes Cloe's love interest, to Zak's disgust. He has a dark and goth appearance then in the final he becomes on the great zorn.
- Kido - Same as Lon, he joins the Sendokai group in season 2. He's a Kiwun from planet Masara and when not fighting, he usually serves as comic relief.

== Series overview ==
Season	Episodes	Originally aired (Spain dates)	
Season	Episodes	Season premiere	Season finale
1	26	April 2, 2013 (Spain)	October 1, 2013 (Spain)
2	26	May 10, 2014 (Spain)	2015 (Spain)
3	20	May 30, 2026 (Spain)	TBA (Spain)

== List of episodes ==
=== Season 1 (2013) ===
No.	Title	Original release date	US air date	Prod. code
1	"SEN-DO-KAI"	April 2, 2013	Apr 17, 2015	101
2	"More Than a Wristband"	April 9, 2013	Apr 17, 2015	102
3	"The Urlok Dimension"	April 16, 2013	Apr 23, 2015	103
4	"Let's Get Started"	April 23, 2013	Apr 25, 2015	104
5	"The Hidden Ones"	April 30, 2013	Apr 30, 2015	105
6	"Luls"	May 7, 2013	May 2, 2015	106
7	"A Perfect Shot"	May 7, 2013	May 7, 2015	107
8	"Legendary Warriors"	May 14, 2013	May 9, 2015	108
9	"Move It!"	May 21, 2013	May 14, 2015	109
10	"The Guardian of the Chest"	May 28, 2013	May 16, 2015	110
11	"Tai-Sen Trial"	June 4, 2013	May 21, 2015	111
12	"The Final Test"	June 11, 2013	May 23, 2015	112
13	"Let The Tournament Begin!"	June 18, 2013	May 28, 2015	113
14	"One for All"	June 25, 2013	May 30, 2015	114
15	"Trust Me"	July 2, 2013	June 6, 2015	115
16	"The Tournament Comes..."	July 9, 2013	June 8, 2015	116
17	"Accept Your Felings, Zak"	August 6, 2013	June 13, 2015	117
18	"Nu-Sen Flare"	August 13, 2013	June 15, 2015	118
19	"My Dearest Enemy"	August 20, 2013	June 20, 2015	119
20	"The Dark Side"	August 27, 2013	June 22, 2015	120
21	"Ghosts of the Past"	September 3, 2013	June 27, 2015	121
22	"For the Good Old Days"	September 10, 2013	June 29, 2015	122
23	"No Turning Back"	September 17, 2013	July 3, 2015	123
24	"The Final"	September 24, 2013	July 4, 2015	124
25	"The End is Near"	September 24, 2013	TBA	125
26	"Four Sendokai Warriors"	October 1, 2013	TBA	126

=== Season 2 (2014–15) ===
No.	Title	Original release date	US air date	Prod. code
27	"A Good Story"	May 10, 2014	TBA	201
28	"A New Adventure"	May 17, 2014	TBA	202
29	"Danima"	May 24, 2014	TBA	203
30	"Yakis"	June 7, 2014	TBA	204
31	"Trust us, Lon"	June 14, 2014	TBA	205
32	"Kido The Destroyer"	June 21, 2014	TBA	206
33	"Babysitter"	July 5, 2014	TBA	207
34	"An Unbreakable Team"	July 12, 2014	TBA	208
35	"Duo-Sen Lightning Bolt"	July 19, 2014	TBA	209
36	"A Good Leader"	July 26, 2014	TBA	210
37	"Uncertain Times"	August 2, 2014	TBA	211
38	"I’ll Never Forget You"	August 9, 2014	TBA	212
39	"Stupid Sendokai"	TBA	TBA	213
40	"The First Great Tournament"	TBA	TBA	214
41	"The Norkingos"	TBA	TBA	215
42	"A Hero for Masara"	TBA	TBA	216
43	"You Are Alone"	TBA	TBA	217
44	"Friends and Rivals"	TBA	TBA	218
45	"May the Best Team Win"	TBA	TBA	219
46	"Traitors"	TBA	TBA	220
47	"The Twilight of the Hakuru"	TBA	TBA	221
48	"The Hour of Truth"	TBA	TBA	222
49	"The Power of the Baron"	TBA	TBA	223
50	"The Great Zorn"	TBA	TBA	224
51	"Rise of the Hakuru"	TBA	TBA	225
52	"Something in Common"	2015	TBA	226

=== Special (2025) ===
No.	Title	Original release date	US air date	Prod. code
53	"Sendokai Champions Sengate"	May 31, 2025	January 28, 2026	301

=== Season 3 (2026) ===
No.	Title	Original release date	US air date	Prod. code
54–55	"Sendokai Champions 3: Rebirth"	May 30, 2026	TBA	TBA
