= Peter Holmes (businessman) =

British businessman (1932–2002)

Sir Peter Fenwick Holmes MC
- Born: 27 September 1932; Athens, Greece
- Died: 8 March 2002 (aged 69); Wiltshire, England
- Education: Malvern College; Trinity College, Cambridge
- Spouses: Judith Millicent Walker (m. 1955; div. 1999) Mary Lois Snead (m. 1999)
- Military career
- Allegiance: United Kingdom
- Branch: British Army
- Service years: 1950–1952
- Rank: Second Lieutenant
- Unit: Royal Leicestershire Regiment
- Conflicts: Korean War

Sir Peter Fenwick Holmes MC (27 September 1932 – 8 March 2002) was a British businessman who was the chairman of Shell Transport and Trading from 1985 to 1993 and chairman of the Royal Dutch/Shell Group from 1992 to 1993.

== Early life ==
Holmes was born in Athens, and lived in Hungary for a time, as his father had a company there, and his mother was American. His grandfather and great grandfather lived in Turkey, where they worked for the Levant consular service.

Holmes was educated at Malvern College, and Trinity College, Cambridge, where he earned a bachelor's degree in history in 1955.

While a university student, he served in the Royal Leicestershire Regiment during the Korean War, where he won the Military Cross in 1952.

== Career ==
After earning his degree, Holmes spent some time on an expedition to the Himalayas, then he was hired by Shell UK in 1956. He worked during four years before going back to the mountains.

He then held positions for Shell in various countries, including Sudan, Libya (when Muammar Gaddafi came to power), Dubai, Turkey and Nigeria (1977).

He was appointed chairman of Shell Transport and Trading Company in 1985. During his tenure, he quickly faced a sharp drop in oil prices from $30 to $10 a barrel.

He also had to deal with angry protests against the company because of its presence in South Africa, country overwhelmed by apartheid problems. He came to terms with the African National Congress, and helped fund a training scheme to prepare ANC executives for government. Nelson Mandela even thanked him when he was released from jail.

He became chairman of the committee of managing directors of the Royal Dutch Shell Group in 1992 and stepped off in 1993, leaving the chair to Cor Herkströter.

== Retirement ==
When Holmes retired in 1993, instead of continuing as a non-executive director in the boards of large corporations, he became president of the Hakluyt Foundation, a new office in charge of providing intelligence for big companies. He thus went back to some adventure, but missed being killed in a light plane crash in Zambia.

== Personal life ==
After graduating in 1955, Holmes made the second ascent, with Trevor Braham, of 6,303 metres (20,679 ft) Chau Chau Kang Nilda, from the barren plateau of Spiti. There were other mountaineering achievements during the two year visit to the Himalayas with his wife Judy, who was also a mountaineer.

They had three children and remained married until 1999. He entered into a second marriage with Mary Snead. He died of leukemia in March 2002 at the age of 69.

== Writing ==
Holmes wrote under the name Peter Fenwick, a truncation of his full name. His publications included Mountains and a monastery (1958), Nigeria, giant of Africa (1985), Turkey, a timeless bridge (1988), Türkye (1988).

Business positions
Preceded by Lodewijk Christiaan van Wachem	Chairman of the Committee of Managing Directors of Royal Dutch Shell; 1992-1993	Succeeded by Cor Herkströter
Preceded by Peter Brian Baxendell	President-Director of Shell Transport and Trading Company; 1985-1993	Succeeded by John Jennings
