= John Jennings (businessman) =

British geologist (1937–2024)

Sir John Southwood Jennings CBE FRSE FGS (30 March 1937 – 29 August 2024) was a British geologist who was Chancellor of Loughborough University, having previously been chairman of Shell Transport and Trading from 1993 to 1997, and a director until 2001.

Jennings was born in Oldbury, Worcestershire, the son of George Southwood Jennings and Irene Beatrice Bartlett. He was educated at Oldbury Grammar School and Birmingham University. Sir John is Sloan Fellow of the London Business School and has honorary doctorates from Birmingham and Edinburgh Universities, having previously gained a BSc in Geology in 1958 and a PhD from the University of Edinburgh three years later. He joined Shell in 1968 and advanced through the ranks to become Managing Director of the Royal Dutch Shell Group from 1987 to 1997 and Chairman of the Shell Transport and Trading Company plc from 1993 to 1997, when he was knighted. Sir John was a Director of the company between 1987 and 2001.

Jennings succeeded Sir Denis Rooke to become Loughborough University's fourth Chancellor in 2003, he retired from this position in July 2010

Jennings died on 29 August 2024, at the age of 87.

Academic offices
| Preceded by Sir Denis Rooke | Chancellor of Loughborough University; 2003–2010 | Succeeded by Nigel Rudd |
Business positions
| Preceded by Peter Fenwick Holmes | Chairman of Shell Transport and Trading; 1993–1997 | Succeeded by Mark Moody-Stuart |
