= Frits de Kok =

Johan Egbert Frederik "Frits" de Kok (6 January 1882 in Maastricht – 28 October 1940 in The Hague) was the General Managing Director of the Royal Dutch Petroleum Company from 1937 to October 1940. This was the most senior executive position in the company and due to the structure of Royal Dutch Shell at the time was, with the Chairman of the Shell Transport and Trading Company, the joint senior executive position in the Royal Dutch Shell group.

Business positions
Preceded by Henri Deterding	General Managing Director of Royal Dutch Petroleum Company; 1937 – October 1940	Succeeded by For the rest of the WW2 there was no single leader of Royal Dutch; Guus Kessler (from 1947) as General Managing Director of Royal Dutch Petroleum Company
Preceded by Henri Deterding	General Managing Director of Royal Dutch Petroleum Company; 1937 – October 1940	Succeeded by Guus Kessler (from 1946) as senior position in Royal Dutch Shell (from 1946 Chairman of the Committee of Managing Directors created)
