= Michael Pocock (businessman) =

English oilman

Major Carmichael Charles Peter Pocock CBE
- Born: 25 March 1920
- Died: 12 October 1979 (aged 59)
- Education: Rossall School; Keble College, Oxford
- Spouse: Nina Alice Hilary Hearn (m. 1943)
- Children: 3
- Military career
- Allegiance: United Kingdom
- Branch: British Army
- Service years: 1939–1945
- Rank: Major
- Unit: Royal Corps of Signals
- Conflicts: World War II

Major Carmichael Charles Peter Pocock CBE (25 March 1920 – 12 October 1979) was an English oilman who worked for Shell from 1946 until his death in 1979. On 1 July 1976, Pocock became chairman of the Shell Transport and Trading Company, and on 1 July 1977 became the chairman of the Committee of Managing Directors of the Royal Dutch/Shell Group. He held both positions until his death at the age of 59.

== Early life and education ==
Pocock was born on 25 March 1920 and was the son of Lieutenant-Colonel Joseph Albert Pocock. Michael was educated in Belgium and at Rossall School.

He entered Keble College, Oxford on a scholarship to study Classics, but left university when World War II began. During the war he served in the Royal Corps of Signals and attained the rank of major.

== Career ==
In 1946 Pocock joined Shell and worked initially in Venezuela and London. He eventually became the vice-president of the Compañía Shell de Venezuela, and in 1964 the president. In 1968 he became the regional co-ordinator for East and Australasia.

On 1 July 1970 he became a managing director of Shell Petroleum, which also placed him on the Committee of Managing Directors of the Royal Dutch/Shell Group. In 1977 he became chairman of Shell Transport and Trading, and in 1978 Chairman of the Committee of Managing Directors.

== Personal life and death ==
On 11 September 1943 in Goring-on-Thames, Pocock married Nina Alice Hilary Hearn (1919–2013). They had three children: Harriet, Nicholas, and Victoria. Pocock was a member of Buck's Club. He died in London on 12 October 1979 at age 59. After Michael's death, Nina remarried in 1984 to Peter Samuel, 4th Viscount Bearsted, the grandson of Shell's founder Marcus Samuel.
