= John Hugo Loudon =

Dutch entrepreneur (1905 - 1996)

John Hugo Loudon KBE
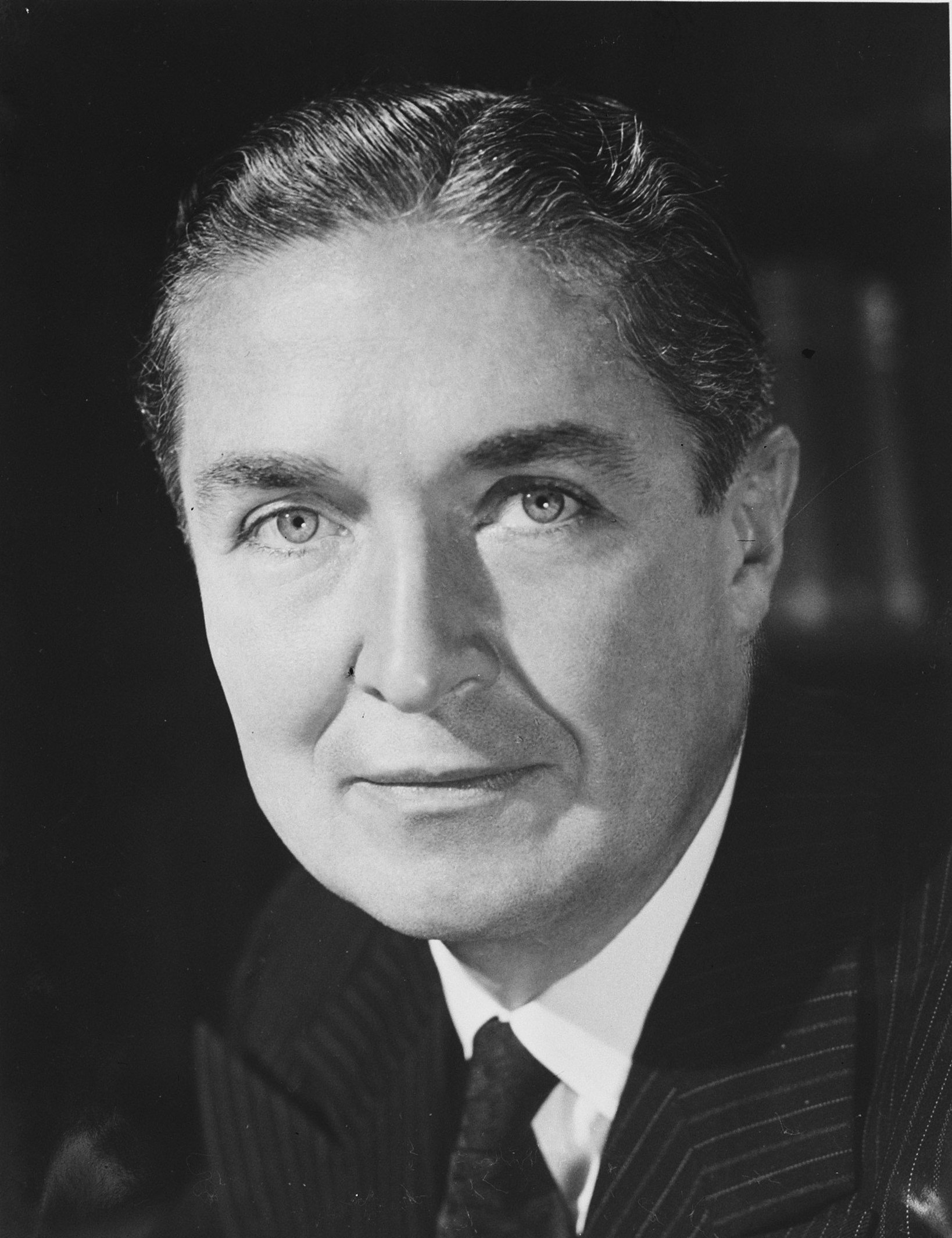
- John Hugo Loudon in 1958
- Born: John Hugo Loudon; 27 June 1905; The Hague, Netherlands
- Died: 4 February 1996 (aged 90); Haarlem, Netherlands
- Occupations: CEO of Shell (1952 to 1965); President of WWF (1976 to 1981)

Jonkheer John Hugo Loudon KBE (27 June 1905 – 4 February 1996) was the CEO of Royal Dutch Shell from 1952 to 1965 and the president of World Wide Fund for Nature.

== Early life ==
Born in The Hague, Netherlands, the son of former Shell president Hugo Loudon and grandson of Jonkheer Hugo Loudon, John Hugo Loudon got a law degree at Utrecht University. He joined the company in 1930, working in the oilfields of Lake Maracaibo, Venezuela.

== Career ==
In 1952, Loudon became the head of Shell Petroleum. In this role he tried to prevent discrimination between nationals and non-nationals in the work force. In May 1960, he was featured on Time magazine's cover. He resigned as the CEO of Shell in 1965 and continued to serve the company as chairman of the board of supervisory directors for the next 11 years.

Following his role with Shell, Loudon was appointed the chairman of an international business advisory committee at Chase Bank by David Rockefeller. Loudon retired from this role in 1977.

Loudon became president of World Wide Fund for Nature in 1977 and served as president until 1981.

== Personal life ==
In 1931 he married Marie van Tuyll van Serooskerken who became lady in waiting to Queen Wilhelmina and with whom he had four children. Later he married Charlotte van Sminia.

Loudon spoke five languages and was a member of the Royal yacht Squadron.

His niece Lydia Frederika Loudon was the wife of the Scottish businessman and politician Sir Jack Stewart-Clark.

Business positions
Preceded by Barthold Theodoor Willem van Hasselt	Chairman of the Committee of Managing Directors of Royal Dutch Shell; 1952–1965	Succeeded by Jan Brouwer
Preceded by Barthold Theodoor Willem van Hasselt	General Managing Director of Royal Dutch Petroleum Company (title changed in 1956 to President-Director); 1952–1965	Succeeded by Jan Brouwer
