= Mark Moody-Stuart =

British businessman

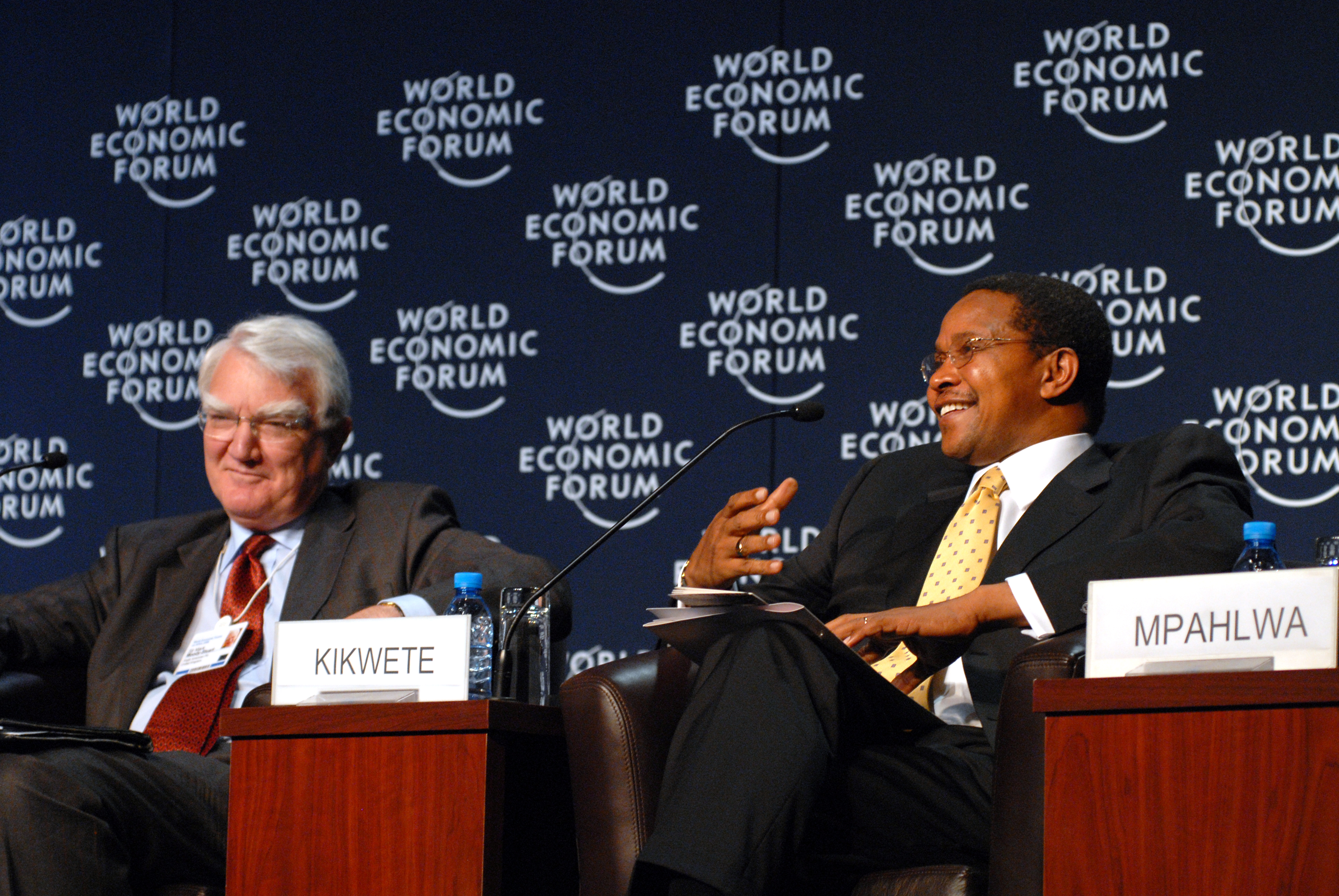
Mark Moody-Stuart and Tanzanian president Jakaya Kikwete at the World Economic Forum on Africa (2006).

Sir Mark Moody-Stuart KCMG (born 15 September 1940) is a British businessman, He was appointed non-executive chairman of Anglo American PLC in 2001, serving until 2009. He has been chairman of Hermes Equity Ownership Services since 2009.

He is a former chairman of Royal Dutch Shell and a director of HSBC Holdings and of Accenture. He is chairman of the Foundation for the Global Compact and was a director of the Global Reporting Initiative (GRI) until December 2007. He is a director of Saudi Aramco. He was knighted in 2000 (KCMG).

Moody-Stuart became a managing director of Shell Transport and Trading Company plc in 1991 and was chairman of Royal Dutch/Shell from 1998-2001. He was succeeded by Sir Philip Watts.

In February 2008, he hit the headlines with a call for a ban on "gas-guzzlers".

== Family and education ==
He was born in Antigua the son of a sugar plantation owner, and educated at Shrewsbury School and at St. John's College, Cambridge, where he obtained a PhD on a thesis on the Devonian sediments of Spitsbergen. He became a Fellow of this College in 2001.

In 1964, he married Judy McLeavy. They have three sons and a daughter.

== Career with Shell ==
- 1966 Joined Shell
- Geologist in Spain, Oman and Brunei
- 1972 Chief Geologist in Australia
- 1976 Leader of North Sea exploration teams, Shell UK Expro
- 1976 Manager, Western Division Shell Petroleum Development Company, Nigeria.
- 1979 General Manager, Turkey
- 1982 Chairman and Chief Executive, Malaysia
- 1990 Exploration and Production Co-ordinator
- 1991 Group Managing Director
- 1998 Chairman of the Committee of Managing Directors of the Royal Dutch/Shell Group
- 2001 Gave up Chair of Shell but remained on the Board
- 2005 Retired from Shell

== Publications ==
- Responsible Leadership: Lessons From the Front Line of Sustainability and Ethics, Greenleaf Publishing, 2014. ISBN 9781906093969

Business positions
Preceded by Cor Herkströter	Chairman of the Committee of Managing Directors of Royal Dutch Shell; 1998–2001	Succeeded by Philip Watts
Preceded by John Southwood Jennings	Chairman of Shell Transport and Trading; 1997–2001	Succeeded by Philip Watts
