= Guus Kessler =

Dutch industrialist (1888–1972)

Jean Baptiste August "Guus" Kessler Jr. (16 June 1888 – 5 November 1972) was a Dutch industrialist. Kessler also played tennis for the Netherlands in the 1906 Olympics in Athens, losing his first match to future Olympic champion Max Decugis.

Kessler was born in a very wealthy family from The Hague, the second son of six children. His father Jean Baptiste August Kessler (1853–1900) was the first director of the Koninklijke Nederlandse Petroleum Maatschappij (Royal Dutch Petroleum Company), now named Royal Dutch Shell. Guus studied engineering at Delft University.

Both Guus and his older brother Geldolph Adriaan Kessler were considered the "crown princes" of the Royal Dutch, but after their father died unexpectedly they had to work under their father's domineering successor, Henri Deterding. Dolf eventually left, at the urging of his fiancé, and helped create and lead the Dutch steel company Hoogovens. Guus, by contrast, seemed to get along better with Deterding. "The brothers were also strong willed but only Guus, the younger son, succeeded in controlling his emotions and avoiding coming into conflict with Deterding, in order to reach his ultimate goal," wrote Joost Junker and Jan Luiten van Zandem in their history of the company. The two brothers, as leading figures in two major Dutch business concerns, at one point formed a joint venture between the Hoogovens and Royal Dutch Shell to combat a threat to the oil business by IG Farben. Guus, who became a director of Royal Dutch in 1923, was instrumental in leading Shell into the petroleum-based chemicals business.

Guus was the "obvious candidate" to lead Royal Dutch Shell after Deterding was forced out in 1936, but instead he was passed over in favor of a compromise choice. "It must have been a huge disappointment to Kessler to see his life's ambition thwarted with fulfillment so near." He eventually achieved his dream and became director-general of Royal Dutch Shell in the years 1947–1949, retiring at age 60. For the next 12 years, he served as president-commissioner of the company.

Guus and his first wife, Anna Francoise "Ans" Kessler-Stoop (1889–1983), had five daughters and one son. In 1932, they commissioned the noted French Fauvist Raoul Dufy to paint a portrait of the family on their horses, a work that now hangs in the Tate Collection in London. Ans was a noted collector of modern art, advised by her uncle C. Frank Stoop, and donated to the Tate Collection a substantial portfolio that included works by Pablo Picasso, Henri Matisse, Amedeo Modigliani and Edgar Degas. She purchased a Vincent van Gogh painting on paper in 1930 and it was sold at auction for 8.8 million British pounds in 1997 by a family trust.

The marriage of Guus and Ans ended in divorce. He married Thalia "Lia" de Kempenaer (1917–2000) in 1948.

== References and sources ==
=== Sources ===
- Zanden, Jan Luiten van; Jonker, Joost; Howarth, Stephen; Sluyterman, Keetie (2007). A History of Royal Dutch Shell. Oxford University Press. ISBN 978-0-19-929877-8.
- Buchanan, Brenda, ed. (2006). "Ernst Homburg: 'Explosives from Oil: The Transformation of Royal Dutch/Shell during World War I from Oil to Petrochemical Company'". Gunpowder, Explosives and the State: A Technological History. Ashgate Publishing Company. ISBN 978-0754652595.

Business positions
Preceded by Frits de Kok to Oct 1940 - For the rest of the WW2 there was no single leader of Royal Dutch	General Managing Director of Royal Dutch Petroleum Company; 1947–1948	Succeeded by Barthold Theodoor Willem van Hasselt
Preceded by Position created in 1946 prior to this the General MD of Royal Dutch (Frits de Kok to Oct 1940) and the Chairman of Shell (Walter Horace Samuel to Jul 1946) were jointly the most senior executives	Chairman of the Committee of Managing Directors of Royal Dutch Shell; 1946–1948	Succeeded by Barthold Theodoor Willem van Hasselt
