= Walter van de Vijver =

Head of production At Royal Dutch Shell

Walter van de Vijver (born November 1955) was the head of exploration and production at Royal Dutch Shell. He was dismissed in 2004 following a scandal about the size of the company's reserves.
