= Peter Baxendell =

British businessman (1925–2025)

Sir Peter Baxendell CBE FREng
- Born: 28 February 1925; Runcorn, Cheshire, England
- Died: 13 September 2025 (aged 100)
- Education: St Francis Xavier's College; Royal School of Mines
- Spouse: Rosemary Lacey (m. 1949; died 2021)
- Children: 4

Sir Peter Brian Baxendell CBE FREng (28 February 1925 – 13 September 2025) was a British oilman who worked for Shell from 1946 to 1985. From 1979 to 1985 Baxendell was the chairman of Shell Transport and Trading, and from 1982 to 1985 he was the chairman of the Royal Dutch/Shell Group.

== Life and career ==
Baxendell was born in Runcorn, Cheshire on 28 February 1925, to Roman Catholic parents Leslie Wilfred Edward Baxendell (1892–1968) and Evelyn Mary Gaskin (1895–1992). He was educated at St Francis Xavier's College in Liverpool, and the Royal School of Mines in London. Baxendell joined Shell in 1946 as a petroleum engineer. In 1947 he was posted to Egypt, and in 1950 to Venezuela. In 1963 he became the technical director of Shell-BP Nigeria, and in 1966 returned to London where he became the head of the Shell's Southeast Asia Division. He was made the managing director of Shell-BP Nigeria in 1969.

In 1973 he was appointed a managing director of Shell UK, which placed him on the Royal Dutch/Shell Group Committee of Managing Directors. The following year he became chairman of Shell UK. In 1979 he was elected chairman of Shell Transport and Trading, and in 1982 became chairman of the Committee of Managing Directors. He was also chairman of Hawker Siddeley and was a director of Sun Life and Inchcape. Baxendell retired on 1 July 1985 at age 60. He was knighted in the 1981 Birthday Honours.

In 1949, Baxendell married Rosemary Lacey. They had four children: Anne, Gillian, Peter, and John. Lady Baxendell died on 8 June 2021 at age 95.

Baxendell died on 13 September 2025, at the age of 100. The funeral was held on 7 October 2025 at the Church of Our Most Holy Redeemer in Chelsea.
