= Pierre Malotaux =

Dutch organisational theorist (1923–2016)

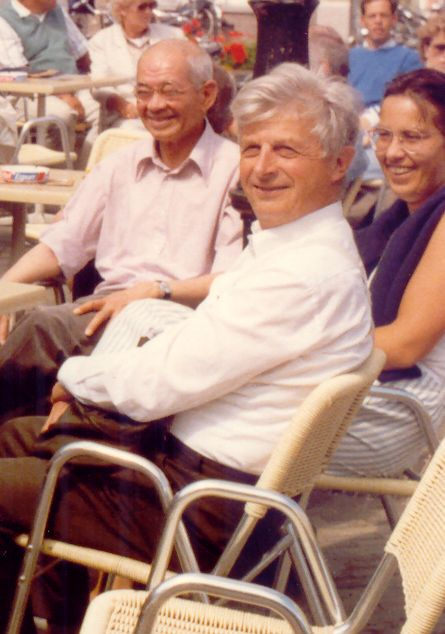
Pierre Malotaux, Zeeland 1987-88.

Pierre Charles-André Malotaux (28 April 1923 – 14 February 2016) was a Dutch organizational theorist, business consultant, and Professor of Business Administration at the Delft University of Technology. His is known with Jan in 't Veld for developing a specific systems approach to organizational problems, called the Delft Systems Approach.

== Biography ==
=== Youth, education and early career ===
Malotaux was born in Delft in 1923, the son of Robert Nicolas Marc August Malotaux (1898-1984) and Alice Cesarine Michiels (1897-1975). He was named after his grandfather, Pierre Malotaux, who came from Valenciennes, France. He attended the Hogere Burgerschool, where he graduated in 1940. In that year he started to study aerospace engineering at Delft University of Technology, where interrupted by the second World War he obtained his kandidaats exam in 1948 and his Engineering degree in 1951.

After graduating, he started his career at the Koninklijke Hoogovens in IJmuiden in 1951 at the psychotechnical department. From 1953 to 1959 he was consultant at a consultancy agency for business economics. In 1959 he settled as independent business consultant, and participated in the working group on business administration at the Koninklijk Instituut van Ingenieurs.

=== Further career ===
In 1968 at the Delft University of Technology he was appointed Professor of Business Administration at the Department of General Science. The first Professor of Business Administration in Delft had been appointed in 1909 and Malotaux was the six professor in a row. He predecessor Jacob Louis Mey had served from 1964 to 1965. However, instead of appointed one successor, in 1968 three professors were appointed: Malotaux, Jan in 't Veld, and Henk Lombaers. Malotaux was to focus on general aspects of business theory, In 't Veld on industrial organization and Lombaerts on Operations research.

In cooperation with Jan in 't Veld and several other engineers and social scientists, Malotaux developed a specific systems approach to organizational problems, which is called the Delft Systems Approach. In the 1980s Malotaux was initiator of the national network on Reliability, Maintenance management and Maintenance technology company. Their publications on this subject gave a start on life cycle thinking about technical systems in the Netherlands. In 1994 he was succeeded by Jan Willem Koolhaas, who left in 1998.

In 2004 Malotaux received a Royal decoration and was invested as a Knight of the Order of Orange-Nassau. In the same year with Jan in 't Veld he was appointed honorable member to the KIVI NIRIA Business Administration department.

The PhD students of Malotaux (and year of graduation) have been Jan Willem Koolhaas (1980), Eduard Rudolf Muhring (1987), Willem Gerrit Monhemius (1990) and Riek Boswijk (1992).

Malotaux died 14 February 2016 in Bilthoven.

== Selected publications ==
- Pierre Malotaux and J.J.D. van der Gon, Methode voor kwalitatief grenslaagonderzoek met behulp van gloeidraden zonder beinvloeding der stroming. Technische Hogeschool Delft, Aircraft Engineering, Report VTH-45, 1951.
- Pierre Malotaux. Subjectiveren en objectiveren. TH Delft inaugural lecture on thinking as a process, 1968.
- Pierre Malotaux, Henk Lombaers and Jan in 't Veld. Trio-logie: Variaties over een thema uit de bedrijfsleer, 1969.
- Pierre Malotaux, Pieter Verburg, Klaas Halbertsma, and J.L. Boers (ed.). Organisatiewetenschap en praktijk. Leiden : Stenfert Kroese, 1976.
- Pierre Malotaux, Joop Doorman and Jan in 't Veld. Inleiding Methodologie: cursus 1977/78. TU Delft, 1977.
- D. J. Adriaanse, P.J.M. Maas and Pierre Malotaux. Een psychiatrische behandeleenheid in ontwikkeling : het procesbeschrijvingsmodel in praktijk. Delft : Delftse Universitaire Pers, 1980.
- Pierre Malotaux. Een tussenbalans. Departure speech TU Delft, 1994.
- Pierre Malotaux, H.K. Boswijk and H. van der Heide. Sturen of drijven?. Alphen aan den Rijn : Samsom BedrijfsInformatie, 1995.
- Pierre Malotaux, A.H. Schaafsma and A.F. van der Touw.. Besturend vermogen: organisatie in verval en herstel. Stichting Maatschappij en Onderneming, 1998.
- Wouter ten Haaf, Henk Bikker, and Johan Adriaanse with contributions from Jan in 't Veld and Pierre Malotaux. Fundamentals of business engineering and management: a systems approach to people and organisations, Delft: DUP Science, 2002.
