= Showa Shell Sekiyu =

Japanese petroleum company, 1985 to 2018

Showa Shell Sekiyu K.K.

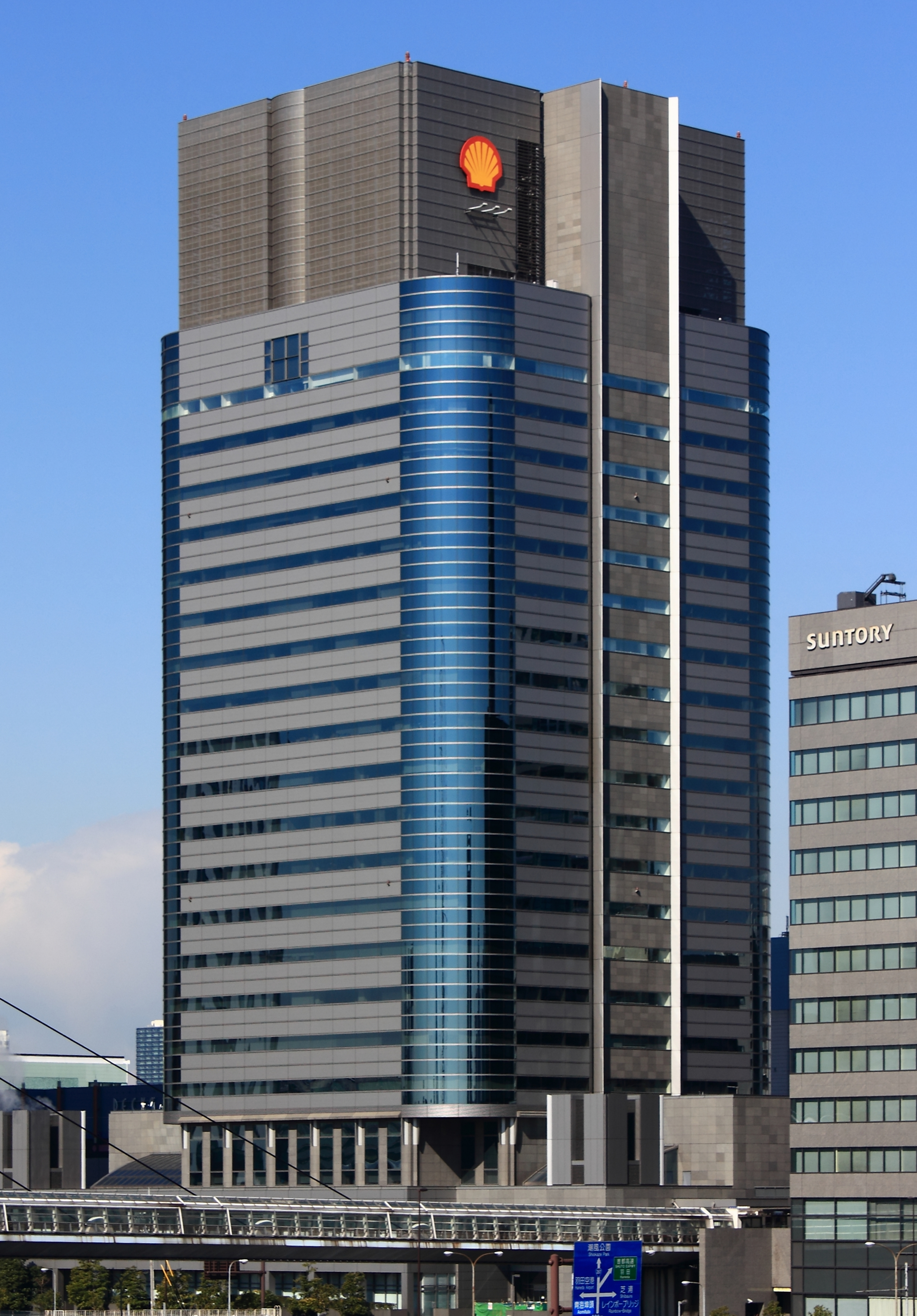
- Showa Shell headquarters in Tokyo, pictured in 2012
- Native name: 昭和シェル石油株式会社
- Romanized name: Shōwa Sheru Sekiyu kabushiki-gaisha
- Formerly: Showa Oil Co., Ltd. (1942–1985)
- Type: Public KK
- Traded as: TYO: 5002
- Industry: Petroleum
- Predecessor: Shell Sekiyu
- Founded: August 1, 1942; 83 years ago
- Founder: Samuel Samuel & Co
- Defunct: 27 March 2019; 7 years ago
- Fate: Sold to Idemitsu Kosan
- Successor: Idemitsu Kosan
- Headquarters: Daiba Frontier Bldg, 2-3-2, Daiba, Minato-ku, Tokyo, Japan
- Area served: Worldwide
- Key people: Jun Arai (CEO); Shigeya Kato (Chairman)
- Products: Petroleum, Natural Gas, Chemicals, LPG, Electric Generation, Solar Power Plant, and Other petrochemicals
- Revenue: JP¥ 2,953 billion (2013), approximately US$ 29.53 billion
- Number of employees: 953
- Parent: Royal Dutch Shell (–2018)

Showa Shell Sekiyu K.K. (昭和シェル石油株式会社, Shōwa Sheru Sekiyu kabushiki gaisha) was a Japanese company that operated as a subsidiary of Royal Dutch Shell until it was acquired by Idemitsu Kosan in 2018 and integrated into the company the following year. It was formed by the merger of Showa Oil Company and Shell Sekiyu which was begun around 1876 in Yokohama by Samuel Samuel & Co, the predecessor of Shell Group today.

Showa Shell Sekiyu acted as an oil and energy products business in Japan and worldwide, from crude oil extraction and refining, to retail and wholesale energy supply operations.

== History ==
=== Origins ===
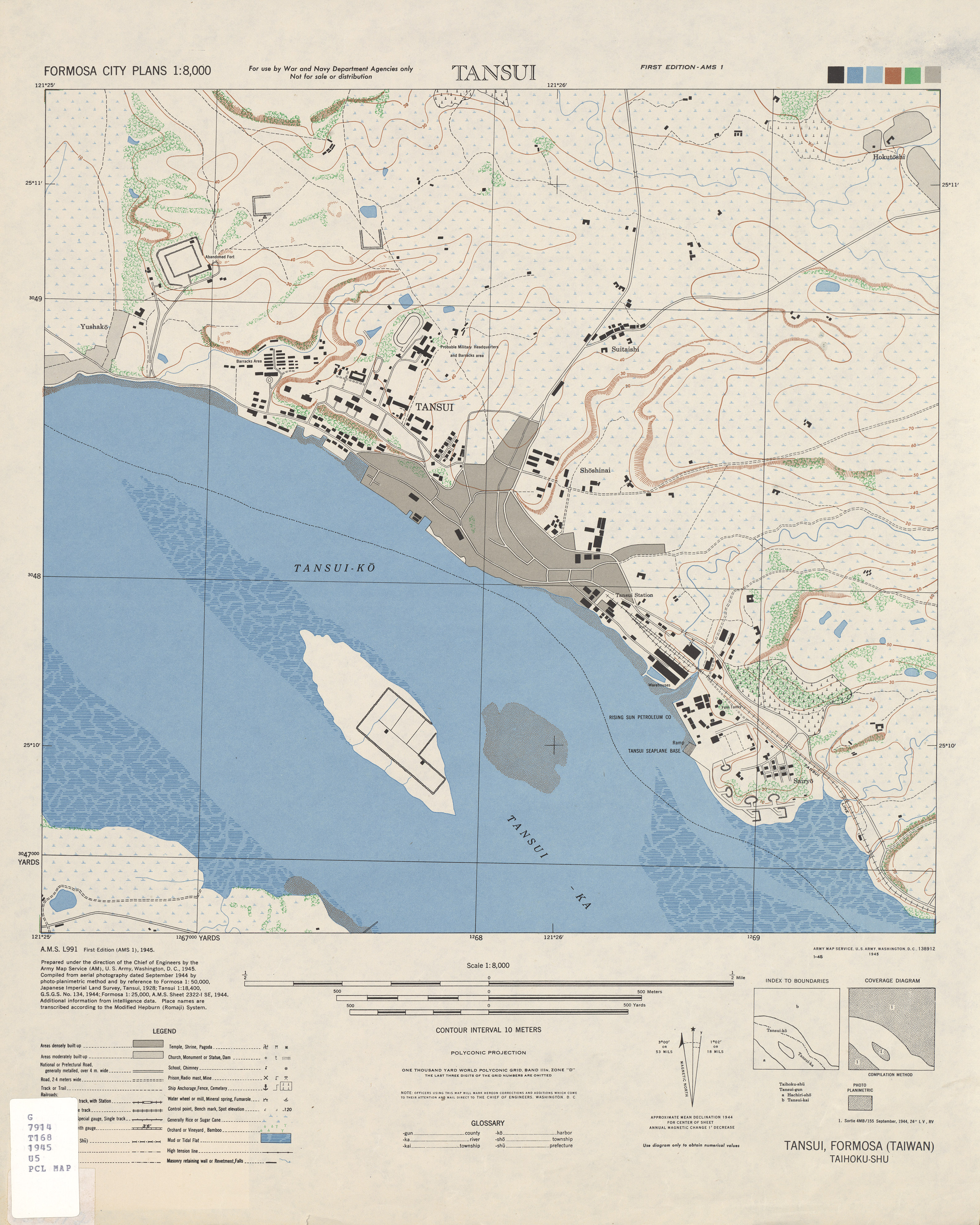
Closeup of a US Army Map Service map of the Shell British Merchant Warehouse and the Rising Sun Petroleum oil terminal in Tamsui District, Taiwan, from 1945.

In 1900, Samuel Samuel & Co, which had started in Japan in 1876 by Samuel Samuel as an international trading business in Yokohama, created an independent petroleum division. It subsequently set up Rising Sun Petroleum Co. Ltd (which later became Shell Petroleum) to expand its distribution channels of candles and kerosene for lamps.

Before long, Samuel Samuel & Co, which expanded as Shell Transport, merged with Royal Dutch to form Royal Dutch/Shell. Rising Sun Petroleum continued to expand its operations as the base of the Shell Group in Japan.

At the same time, oilfields were discovered in Japan along the coast of the Japan Sea primarily in Niigata Prefecture. Hayama Sekiyu and Niitsu Sekiyu, the predecessors of Showa Sekiyu, were established amidst the production of domestic petroleum.

=== 20th century ===
In 1947, Rising Sun Petroleum was renamed Shell Sekiyu and resumed business. Starting with a capital agreement between the Shell Group and Showa Sekiyu, domestic oil companies deepened the collaboration with foreign oil companies.

Shell Sekiyu and Showa Sekiyu merged in 1985 to form Showa Shell Sekiyu.

On February 20, 1993, it lost half its value on the Tokyo Stock Exchange. The group had just announced a loss of one billion dollars on the dollar-yen pair, or 5 times its profits. The treasury manager, who had tried to cover up and hide this financial disaster, had been fired. Yet originally, the company wanted only one thing: to protect the value of its income against a fall in the yen. Only the traders on the currencies of the group took advantage of the lack of control to speculate and no longer content themselves with hedging the risks. They increased the size of their bets in hopes of cutting their losses, which they only made worse.

== Business ==
=== Oil Business ===
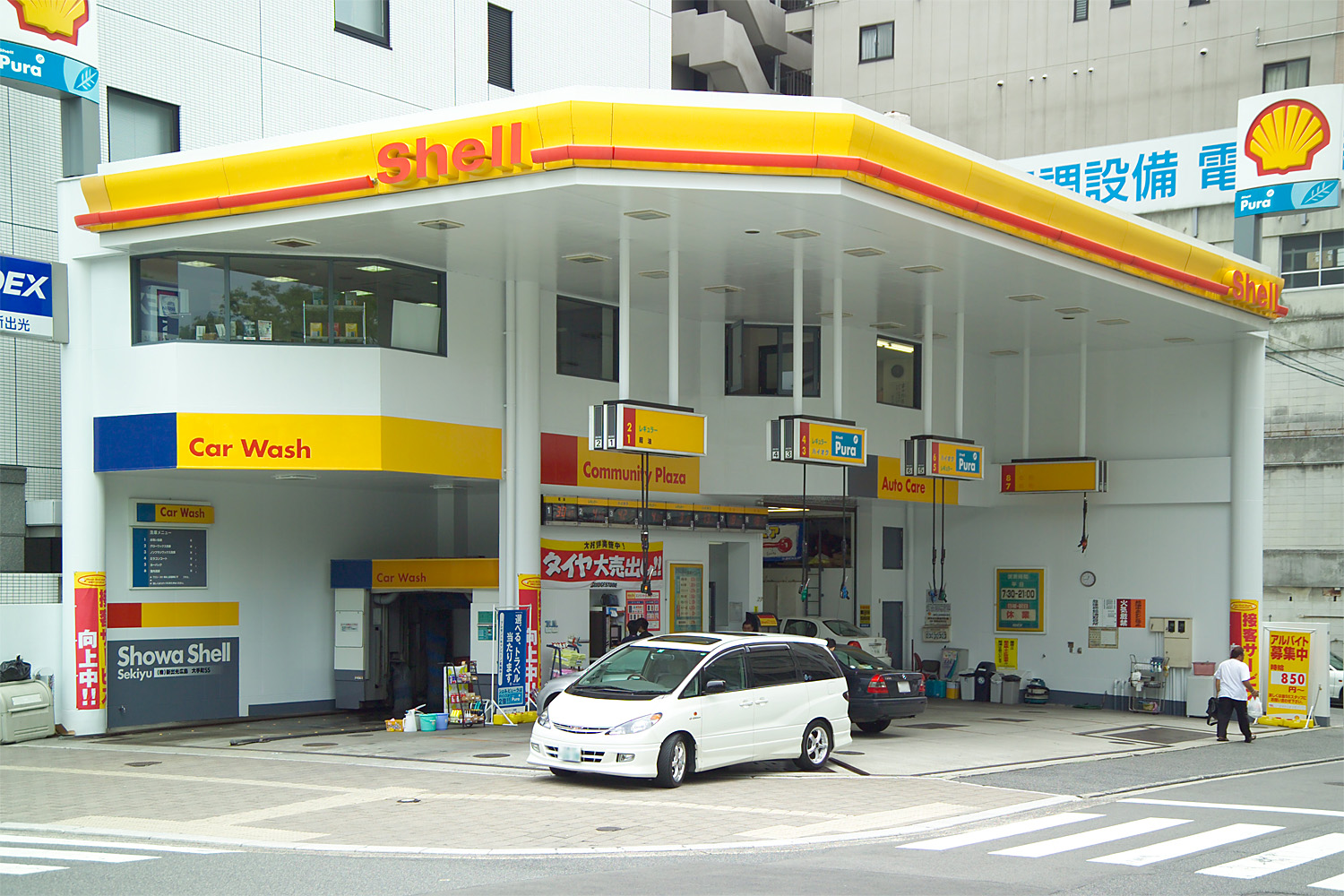
A Shell petrol station in Hiroshima, Japan

Showa Shell Sekiyu refines crude oil imported from around the world at Group refineries in Japan (Yokkaichi, Keihin, and Yamaguchi; crude oil processing capacity: 445,000 barrels/day), and sells it to customers as gasoline and other oil products at about 3,460 (as of Dec 31, 2013) service stations (SS) throughout Japan. In addition, Showa Shell Sekiyu sells oil products including industrial fuels, LPG, chemicals, lubricants, and bitumen, and utilize the Shell Group's global network to export oil products.

=== Energy Business ===
(1) Solar Business

Showa Shell Sekiyu has developed the technology for manufacturing next-generation CIS thin-film solar panels. The production plants owned by its subsidiary Solar Frontier K.K. have a total annual production capacity of about 1GW, and its CIS modules have been sold in Europe, the U.S., the Middle East, and Asia, as well as Japan. Solar Frontier K.K. is providing a wide range of services from plant engineering to plant operation and further to selling those plants to end-users or investors in relation to the solar power plant development.

(2) Electric Power Business

Ohgishima Power Co., Ltd., as a joint venture with Tokyo Gas Co., Ltd., has been operating two natural gas-fired power plants (Ohgishima Power Stations). Showa Shell Group is producing and selling electricity sourcing from clean energy.

== Subsidiaries ==
Showa Shell has a number of subsidiaries and affiliated companies. The company's major subsidiaries include: its solar panel producer Solar Frontier KK.; Japan Oil Network Co, Ltd.; Showa Shell Sempaku K.K.; Showa Shell Business & It Solutions Ltd.; K.K. Enessance Holdings; Niigata Joint Oil Stockpiling Co., Ltd; Hokkaido Joint Oil Stockpiling Co., Ltd.; Toa Oil Co., Ltd.; Seibu Oil Co., Ltd.; Oita L.P.G. Joint Stockpiling Co., Ltd.; Shoseki Engineering & Construction Co., Ltd.; Nippon Grease Co., Ltd.; Heiwa Kisen Kaisha, Ltd.; Ohgishima Power Co., Ltd; On-Site Power Co., Ltd.; Showa Yokkaichi Sekiyu Co., Ltd.; And K.K. Svc Tokyo.

== Sale to Idemitsu Kosan ==
In July 2015 it was announced that Shell would sell its 33.24% stake in the company to Idemitsu Kosan. Shell will keep a 1.8% stake in the company.
