= 1913 Wandsworth by-election =

UK parliamentary by-election

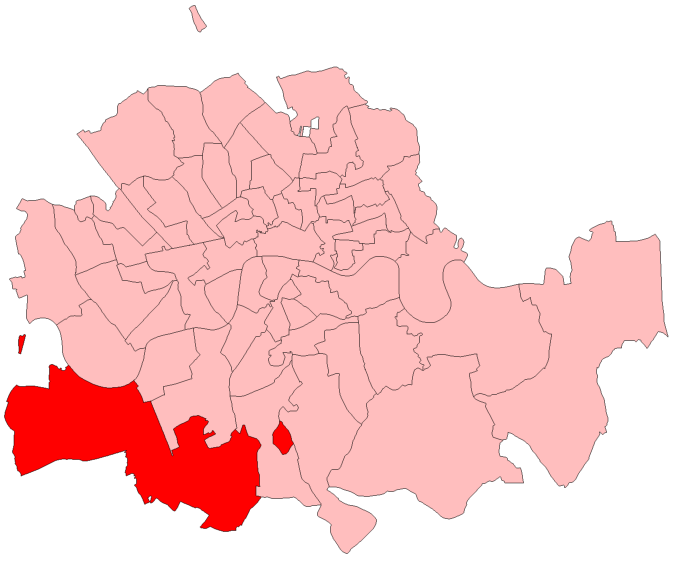
Wandsworth in London 1885-1918

The 1913 Wandsworth by-election was a Parliamentary by-election held on 12 June 1913. The constituency returned one Member of Parliament (MP) to the House of Commons of the United Kingdom, elected by the first past the post voting system.

== Vacancy ==
At the 1885 general election, Sir Henry Kimber was elected as the Member of Parliament (MP) for Wandsworth. He held the seat until his resignation in June 1913, by taking the Chiltern Hundreds.

== Previous result ==
General election December 1910: Wandsworth
Party	Candidate	Votes	%	±%
Conservative	Henry Kimber	15,168	59.0	+2.1
Liberal	James Fairbairn	10,554	41.0	−2.1
Majority		4,614	18.0	+4.2
Turnout		25,722	66.8	−10.7
Conservative hold		Swing	+2.1	

== Candidates ==
Samuel Samuel was chosen by the Unionists to defend the seat. He unsuccessfully contested Leeds West at the 1906 and January 1910 general elections, and was unsuccessful again in Sunderland at the December 1910 general election.

Havelock Wilson was chosen by the local Liberals as their candidate. He was MP for Middlesbrough from 1892 to 1900 and again from 1906 to 1910. He was President of the National Sailors' and Firemen's Union.

== Result ==
The Unionist Party held the seat with an increased majority.

By-Election 12 June 1913: Wandsworth
Party	Candidate	Votes	%	±%
Unionist	Samuel Samuel	13,425	65.4	+6.4
Liberal	Havelock Wilson	7,088	34.6	−6.4
Majority		6,337	30.8	+12.8
Turnout		20,513	51.4	−15.4
Unionist hold		Swing	+6.4	

== Aftermath ==
A General Election was due to take place by the end of 1915. By the summer of 1914, the following candidates had been adopted to contest that election. Due to the outbreak of war, the election never took place.

General Election 1914/15: Wandsworth
Party	Candidate	Votes	%	±%
Unionist	Samuel Samuel			
Liberal	Havelock Wilson			

The constituency was divided at the 1918 general election, and Samuel was returned as a Conservative for the new Putney division of Wandsworth.
