= Hugh Linstead =

British pharmaceutical chemist and barrister

Sir Hugh Nicholas Linstead OBE (3 February 1901 – 27 May 1987) was a British pharmaceutical chemist and barrister who served as Conservative Party Member of Parliament (MP) for Putney for 22 years. Linstead had significant business interests in the pharmaceutical industry. His politics were on the moderate side of the Conservative Party and he was a strong supporter of the National Health Service.

== Family and training ==
Linstead was educated at the City of London School, and then obtained the Jacob Bell Scholarship to the Pharmaceutical Society's School. He worked as a pharmaceutical chemist, and in 1926 was appointed Secretary of the Pharmaceutical Society. In the late 1920s he also trained in law at Birkbeck College, and he was Called to the Bar in 1929 by the Middle Temple. Linstead married Alice Freke in 1928; the couple had two daughters.

== Pharmaceutical industry ==
His position in the Pharmaceutical Society brought him membership of the Home Office Poisons Board. Linstead was a strong defender of the integrity of all those involved in pharmacy. He complained in 1936 that the law did not allow any action to be taken against the author of an article attacking the profession as a whole. In 1937, Linstead was awarded the OBE for services to the industry. In 1938 when the Central Pharmaceutical War Committee was set up, Linstead became its Secretary. He was also involved in the Scouting movement, being Commissioner for Training Scout Officers for the Boy Scouts' Association from 1932.

== By-election candidate ==
In March 1942 Linstead supported the Guild system in pharmaceutical retailing, arguing that after the end of the war, "state control, cartels, and individual effort will all be needed". The next month he was chosen as Conservative Party candidate for Putney after the death of Marcus Samuel. He faced opposition from Captain Bernard Acworth RN (retd.) who stood as an independent; due to the electoral truce the Labour Party gave their support to Linstead.

Controversy was caused in the by-election when Winston Churchill, in his letter of support to Linstead, accused Acworth of supporting a negotiated peace with Japan. Acworth insisted this was untrue. Linstead asked that Acworth publish the letter he sent to members of parliament to clear the matter up. The controversy raged until polling day, when Linstead won comfortably with 8,788 votes to Acworth's 2,939.

== Beveridge report ==
Linstead proved a moderate MP. He joined the Tory Reform Committee and in October 1944 welcomed the report of the Beveridge Committee on social insurance. He was particularly supportive of moves to create a national health service; he cautioned that the administration must be kept efficient. At the 1945 general election, Linstead faced a five-cornered fight against not only Labour and Liberal candidates but also Sir Richard Acland, the leader of Common Wealth and Mrs. E. Tennant, a former Conservative candidate now standing as an independent. Linstead won a majority of 3,887.

The post-war Labour government set up a Joint Negotiating Committee for Hospital Staffs in preparation for the National Health Service in 1946, and Linstead was appointed as chairman. At the time of the dispute between Health minister Aneurin Bevan and representatives of doctors, Linstead called for arbitration between the two, which was involved in all other professions who were to become part of the new service. When the NHS started in 1948 he became chairman of the Wandsworth Group Hospital Committee.

== 1950 election ==
At the 1950 general election, Linstead's constituency underwent boundary changes, bringing into the constituency 12,000 voters from a Labour-held ward formerly in Wandsworth Central. Despite this change, Linstead was re-elected with an increase in his majority to 5,692. In 1951 he was appointed by the Ministry of Health to the Central Health Services Council.

== NHS organisation ==
Linstead received a knighthood in the Coronation Honours' List of 1953. At the 1953 Conservative Party conference, he submitted a paper on "Health and Hospitals" which advocated greater financial freedom for hospital committees including the ability to roll savings over between financial years, and also supported bringing general practitioners within the hospital system. Linstead served as President of the International Pharmaceutical Federation from 1953.

In November 1953, Linstead was inadvertently the cause of some political difficulties to the Conservative government. He moved a motion to annul an Order in Council which lifted an embargo on cut glass imports, arguing that to do so would damage the domestic industry. After debate he intended to withdraw the motion, but the Labour opposition (which wanted to continue the embargo) objected and put the motion to the vote; with the Conservative whips not expecting a division, they lost by four votes. This was the first vote which the government had lost.

== Criticism of medical profession ==
The Home Secretary named Linstead to the Wolfenden Committee investigation prostitution and homosexuality in 1954; Linstead endorsed the conclusions of the report that male homosexuality be decriminalised, and criticised the government for not bringing in legislation. He kept up his interest in the pharmaceutical industry in Parliament, complaining in February 1955 that the public too often believed "magic .. was attached to a bottle of medicine" and that prescriptions were frequently "no more than a palliative given to the patient to satisfy him in a rather vague psychological way". After the 1955 general election, Linstead served two years as Chairman of the Parliamentary and Scientific Committee. He was also chairman of the Franco-British Parliamentary Committee from 1955 to 1960.

== Inquiries and scrutiny ==
In October 1955, Linstead protested that large Communist-inspired delegations urging members of parliament to co-operate more closely with the Soviet Union crowded out "people of good will, anxious to do anything they could to promote international understanding". In January 1956, he was named as the Parliamentary Charity Commissioner for England and Wales, an appointment in the government's control.

He defended the BBC television programme Your Life in Their Hands in 1958, which looked sceptically at the medical profession; some MPs had urged that the BBC be ordered not to broadcast it. However, he criticised the Public Accounts Committee over a report which criticised the pricing of NHS medicines, arguing that the committee did not take evidence from experts. One member of the committee complained that the Association of British Pharmaceutical Industry had refused to take part in the inquiry.

In 1959, Linstead was appointed as the House of Commons member on Medical Research Council. He called for an inquiry into the pay of professions allied with medicine in November 1961; and when the birth defects associated with thalidomide were discovered Linstead believed the problems associated with the drug could not have been predicted. In the 1960s, Linstead became interested in television, and was appointed to the General Advisory Council of the BBC. He believed that the second BBC channel should be funded by a Treasury grant balanced by a payment into the treasury of the profits of independent television. Linstead was on the Joint Subcommittee of the English and Scottish Standing Medical Advisory Committee that was set up following the thalidomide disaster, and was in favour of legislation governing the testing of new drugs.

== Cannabis legislation ==
After winning a spot in the ballot for Private Members Bills in November 1963, Linstead introduced a Bill to make the cultivation of cannabis illegal. His Bill passed into law. He led the fight against the Government's Bill to abolish resale price maintenance in 1964, believing it to be damaging to small chemists; later he moved an amendment to defend the position of chemists which was defeated by only one vote.

== Post-Parliamentary career ==
Linstead was defeated at the 1964 general election, and failed to recapture the seat in 1966. He became Chairman of Macarthys Pharmaceuticals Ltd after leaving Parliament, and also served as Renter Warden for the Worshipful Company of Farriers for 1968–69, Middle Warden for 1969–70, Upper Warden for 1970–71 and Master for the year 1971–72. He was also First Chairman of the Farriers' Registration Council from 1976 to 1979.

== Sources ==
- Who Was Who, A & C Black.
- M. Stenton and S. Lees, Who's Who of British MPs Vol. IV (Harvester Press, 1981)

Parliament of the United Kingdom
Preceded by Marcus Samuel	Member of Parliament for Putney; 1942–1964	Succeeded by Hugh Jenkins
