= Kimber baronets =

Baronetcy in the Baronetage of the United Kingdom

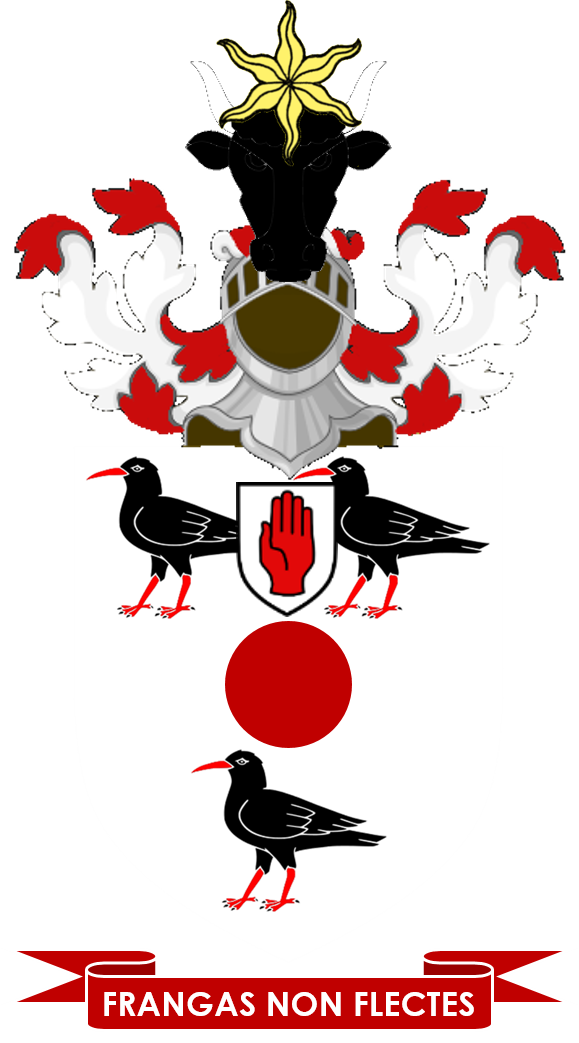
- Coat of arms of the Kimber baronets of Lansdowne Lodge
- Creation date: 1904
- Status: extant
- Motto: Frangas non flectes, You may break me, but you shall not bend me
- Arms: Argent a Torteau between three Choughs proper
- Crest: A Bull's Head cabossed Sable horned Argent between the horns an Estoile Or

The Kimber Baronetcy, of Lansdowne Lodge in Wandsworth in the County of London, is a title in the Baronetage of the United Kingdom. It was created on 24 August 1904 for Henry Kimber. He was the founder of the legal firm of Kimber and Ellis and also sat as Conservative Member of Parliament for Wandsworth between 1885 and 1913.

== Kimber baronets, of Lansdowne Lodge (1904) ==
- Sir Henry Kimber, 1st Baronet (1834–1923)
- Sir Henry Dixon Kimber, 2nd Baronet (1862–1950)
- Sir Charles Dixon Kimber, 3rd Baronet (1912–2008)
- Sir Timothy Roy Henry Kimber, 4th Baronet (1936–2012)
- Sir Rupert Edward Watkin Kimber, 5th Baronet (born 1962)

The heir presumptive is the present holder's brother Hugo Charles Kimber (born 1964).

== Notes ==
Baronetage of the United Kingdom
Preceded by Harmsworth baronets	Kimber baronets of Lansdowne Lodge; 24 August 1904	Succeeded by Palmer baronets
