= John Ambrose Fleming =

British electrical engineer and physicist (1849–1945)

Sir Ambrose Fleming FRS
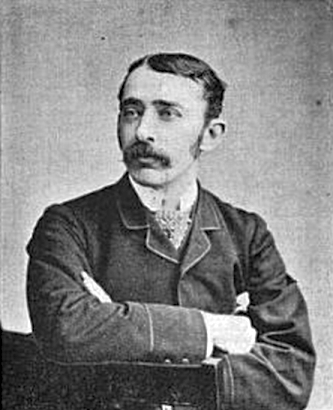
- Fleming in 1890
- Born: 29 November 1849; Lancaster, England
- Died: 18 April 1945 (aged 95); Sidmouth, England
- Education: University of London (BSc, DSc); Royal School of Mines; University of Cambridge (BA)
- Known for: Fleming valve; Fleming's left-hand rule; Fleming's right-hand rule
- Spouses: Clara Ripley (m. 1877; died 1917) Olive Franks (m. 1933)
- Relatives: Ellen Ranyard (maternal aunt); Edward White (maternal uncle)
- Awards: Hughes Medal (1910); Albert Medal (1921); Faraday Medal (1928); Duddell Medal and Prize (1930); IRE Medal of Honor (1933); Franklin Medal (1935)
- Scientific career
- Fields: Electrical engineering; Physics
- Workplaces: University College London
- Academic advisors: Edward Frankland; James Clerk Maxwell
- Notable students: Harold Barlow; Balthasar van der Pol

Sir John Ambrose Fleming (29 November 1849 – 18 April 1945) was a British electrical engineer and physicist. He is known for inventing the vacuum tube radio transmitter, with which the first transatlantic radio transmission was made, and establishing the right-hand rule used in physics.

== Biography ==
John Ambrose Fleming was born on 29 November 1849 in Lancaster, England, the eldest of seven children. His father, The Reverend James Fleming (1815–1879), was a minister of High Street Congregational Chapel. James was born in Kelso, Scotland, and his family was of Flemish origin. In 1854, the Fleming family moved to London, where James became a minister of Kentish Town Congregational Chapel.

Through his mother, Fleming was the nephew of Ellen Ranyard, founder of The London Bible and Domestic Female Mission, and Edward White, a Free Church minister.

=== Education ===
In 1864, Fleming entered University College School, where he excelled in mathematics. Unable to afford the fees to be apprenticed with a professional engineer, he decided to pursue a Bachelor of Science at the University of London. In 1867, he entered University College London (UCL), where he studied physics under George Carey Foster and mathematics under Augustus De Morgan. In his second year of college, he temporarily suspended his studies due to financial difficulties. He subsequently spent four months at a shipbuilding firm in Dublin, before returning to London as a clerk for a company on the London Stock Exchange. He continued his studies while working, and graduated from UCL in 1870.

Following graduation, Fleming took a position teaching science at Rossall School. In 1872, he enrolled at the Royal School of Mines, where he studied advanced chemistry under Edward Frankland. In 1874, he was appointed Science Master at Cheltenham College.

In 1877, Fleming enrolled at St John's College, Cambridge, to study under James Clerk Maxwell. From January 1878 until May 1879, he was one of two students who attended the finial lectures of Maxwell. In 1880, he obtained a Doctor of Science from the University of London and gained first-class honours in the Natural Sciences Tripos. He was elected a Fellow of St John's College in 1883.

=== Career ===
After teaching mechanical engineering for one year at the University of Cambridge, Fleming was appointed Professor of Physics and Mathematics at the newly-founded University College Nottingham. In 1882, he resigned from his professorship to join the Swan United Electric Light Company (which became part of the Edison and Swan Electric Light Company in 1883) in London.

In 1885, Fleming became head of the newly-established Department of Electrical Technology at UCL. Although this offered great opportunities, he recalls in his autobiography that the only equipment provided to him was a blackboard and piece of chalk. In 1897, the Pender Memorial Committee donated £5,000 to the department, which was used to found the Pender Laboratory along with the Pender Chair.

In 1927, Fleming retired from UCL and moved to Sidmouth, where he died on 18 April 1945 at the age of 95.. He remained active during retirement, becoming a committed advocate of the new technology of television, which included serving as the President of the Television Society until his death.

== Inventions ==
=== Radio transmitter ===
In 1899, Guglielmo Marconi, the inventor of radiotelegraphy, decided to attempt transatlantic radio communication. This would require a scale-up in power from the small 200–400 watt transmitters he had used up to then. Marconi contracted Fleming, an expert in power engineering, to design a radio transmitter. He designed the world's first large radio transmitter, a complicated spark transmitter powered by a 25 kW alternator driven by a combustion engine—built at Poldhu, Cornwall—which transmitted the first radio transmission across the Atlantic on 12 December 1901.

Although Fleming was responsible for the design, the director of the Marconi Company had made him agree that: "If we get across the Atlantic, the main credit will be and must forever be Mr. Marconi's". Accordingly, the worldwide acclaim that greeted this landmark accomplishment went to Marconi, who only credited Fleming along with several other Marconi employees, saying he did some work on the "power plant". Marconi also forgot a promise to give him 500 shares of Marconi stock if the project was successful; he was bitter about this treatment. He honoured his agreement and did not speak about it throughout Marconi's life, but after his death in 1937 said Marconi had been "very ungenerous".

=== Fleming valve ===
In 1904, while working for the Marconi Company to improve transatlantic radio reception, Fleming built the first vacuum tube—the two-electrode diode—which he called the "oscillation valve", for which he received a patent on 16 November. It became known as the Fleming valve. The Supreme Court of the United States later invalidated the patent because of an improper disclaimer and, additionally, maintained the technology in the patent was known art when filed.

This invention of the vacuum tube is often considered to have been the beginning of electronics. Fleming's diode was used in radio receivers and radar for many decades afterwards, until it was superseded by solid-state electronic technology more than 50 years later.

==== Patent dispute ====
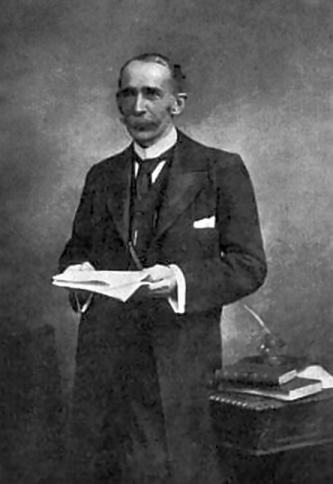
Fleming in 1906

In 1906, American inventor Lee De Forest added a control grid to the valve to create an amplifying vacuum tube RF detector called the Audion, leading Fleming to accuse him of infringing on his patents. De Forest's tube developed into the triode, the first electronic amplifier. The triode was vital in the creation of long-distance telephone and radio communications, radars, and early electronic digital computers (mechanical and electromechanical digital computers already existed using different technology). The court battle over these patents lasted for many years with victories at different stages for both sides.

== Personal life ==
Fleming was born with congenital hearing loss. He attended scientific meetings and debates with an assistant who would make notes.

Fleming was married twice. In 1877, he married Clara Ripley, who died in 1917. He remarried in 1933 to Olive Franks. He had no children from either of his marriages.

Fleming was a noted photographer, painted watercolours, and enjoyed climbing the Alps.

Fleming was a Christian creationist who argued against evolution. He was President of the Victoria Institute from 1927 to 1942.

In 1932, he and Douglas Dewar and Bernard Acworth helped establish the Evolution Protest Movement. Fleming bequeathed much of his estate to Christian charities, especially those for the poor.

== Recognition ==
=== Memberships ===
Year	Organisation	Type	Ref.
1892	Royal Society	Fellow	

=== Awards ===
Year	Organisation	Award	Citation	Ref.
1910	Royal Society	Hughes Medal	"For his researches in electricity and electrical measurements."	
1921	Royal Society of Arts	Albert Medal	—	
1928	Institution of Electrical Engineers	Faraday Medal	—	
1930	Institute of Physics	Duddell Medal and Prize	—	
1933	Institute of Radio Engineers	IRE Medal of Honor	"For the conspicuous part he played in introducing physical and engineering principles into the radio art."	
1935	Franklin Institute	Franklin Medal	"[For] the Invention of the Thermionic Valve."	

=== Honorary degrees ===
Year	University	Degree	Ref.
1928	University of Liverpool	Doctor of Engineering	

=== Honours ===
Year	Country	Honour	Ref.
1929	United Kingdom	Knight Bachelor	

== Commemoration ==
In 1941, the London Power Company commemorated Fleming by naming a new 1,555 GRT coastal collier SS Ambrose Fleming.

In 1971, the Greater London Council erected a blue plaque for Fleming at 9 Clifton Gardens in Maida Vale, London.

== Collections ==
In 1945, Fleming's widow donated Fleming's library and papers to University College London. Fleming's library, which totals around 950 items, includes first editions of works by prominent scientists and engineers such as James Clerk Maxwell, Oliver Lodge, James Dewar and Shelford Bidwell. Fleming's archive spans 521 volumes and 12 boxes; it contains his laboratory notebooks, lecture notes, patent specifications, and correspondence.

== Publications ==
=== Physics ===
- Electric Lamps and Electric Lighting: A course of four lectures on electric illumination delivered at the Royal Institution of Great Britain (1894) 228 pages, OCLC 8202914.
- The Alternate Current Transformer in Theory and Practice "The Electrician" Printing and Publishing Company (1896)
- Magnets and Electric Currents E. & F. N. Spon. (1898)
- A Handbook for the Electrical Laboratory and Testing Room "The Electrician" Printing and Publishing Company (1901)
- Waves and Ripples in Water, Air, and Aether MacMillan (1902).
- The Principles of Electric Wave Telegraphy (1906), Longmans Green, London, 671 pages.
- The Propagation of Electric Currents in Telephone and Telegraph Conductors (1908) Constable, 316 pages.
- An Elementary Manual of Radiotelegraphy and Radiotelephony (1911) Longmans Green, London, 340 pages.
- On the power factor and conductivity of dielectrics when tested with alternating electric currents of telephonic frequency at various temperatures (1912) Gresham, 82 pages, ASIN: B0008CJBIC
- The Wonders of Wireless Telegraphy : Explained in simple terms for the non-technical reader Society for promoting Christian Knowledge (1913)
- The Wireless Telegraphist's Pocket Book of Notes, Formulae and Calculations The Wireless Press (1915)
- The Thermionic Valve and its Development in Radio Telegraphy and Telephony (1919).
- Fifty Years of Electricity The Wireless Press (1921)
- Electrons, Electric Waves and Wireless telephony The Wireless Press (1923)
- Introduction to Wireless Telegraphy and Telephony Sir Isaac Pitman and Sons Ltd. (1924)
- Mercury-arc Rectifiers and Mercury-vapour Lamps London. Pitman (1925)
- The Electrical Educator (3 volumes), The New Era Publishing Co Ltd (1927)
- Television Television Press London. (1928)
- Memories of a Scientific life Marshall, Morgan & Scott (1934)
- Mathematics for Engineers George Newnes Ltd (1938)
- Physics for Engineers George Newnes Ltd (1941)

=== Creationism ===
- The Evidence of Things Not Seen Christian Knowledge Society: London (1904)
- Evolution or Creation? (1938) Marshall Morgan and Scott, 114 pages, ASIN: B00089BL7Y

Cultural offices
Preceded by Richard Haldane	President of the Television Society; 1928–1945	Succeeded by Robert Renwick
