= Lewis Merson Davies =

British soldier, geologist, palaeontologist and author

Lewis Merson Davies FRSE RGS (21 March 1882–22 September 1955) was a soldier, geologist, palaeontologist and author. He is noted for his controversial re-awakening of anti-evolutionary debate in Britain, following the Scopes Trial of 1925 in USA. He was described as "the most knowledgeable geologist and palaeontologist in the world of creationism". Davies was an advocate of gap theory, and one of the few geologists to attempt to reconcile issues such as the geological effects of The Flood (as experienced by Noah) with contemporary geological understanding.

In geological terms he specialised in the area then known as the North-West Frontier of India (now Pakistan) and greatly increased the understanding of the Tertiary fauna.

== Life ==
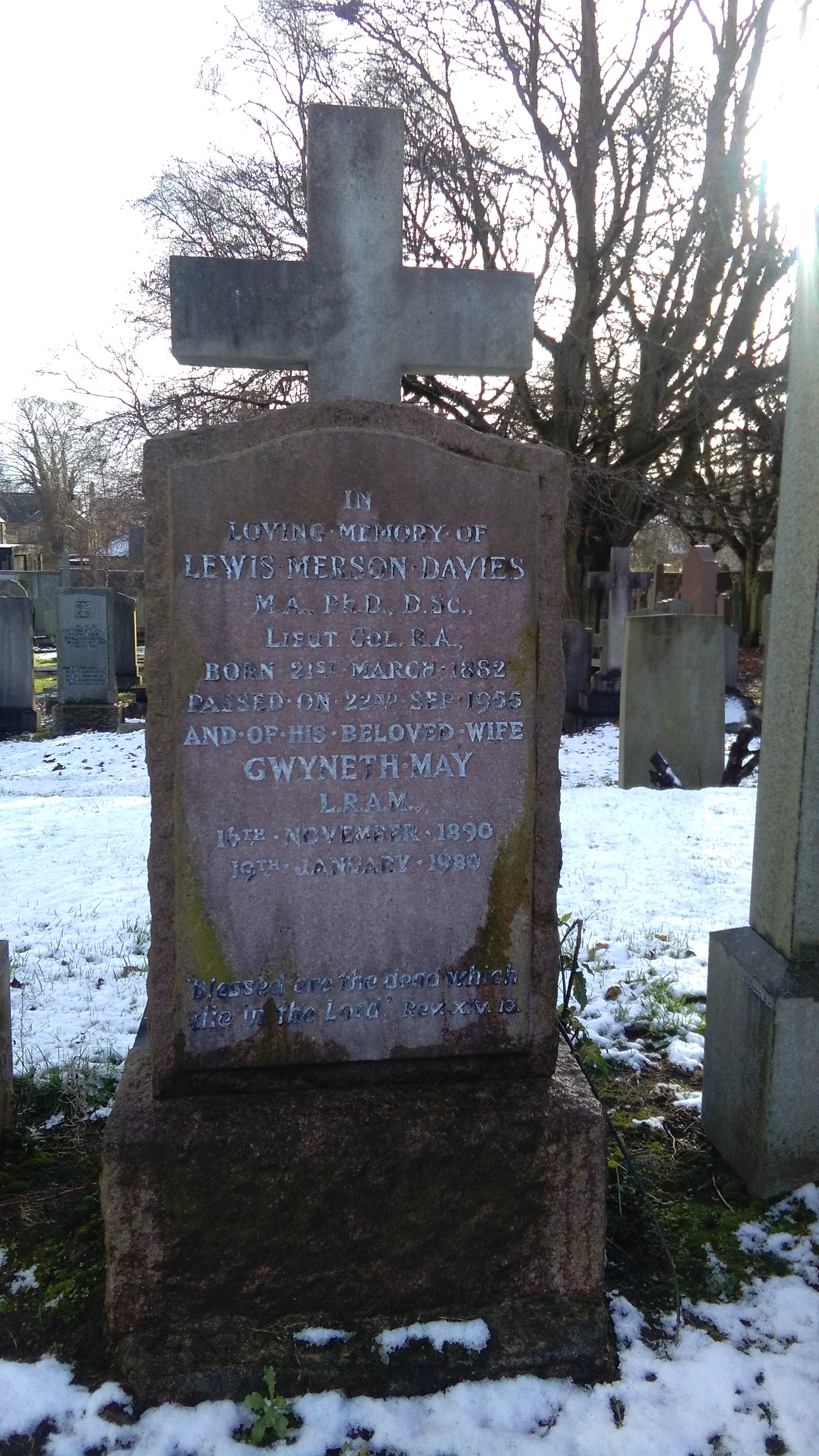
The grave of Lewis Merson Davies, Grange Cemetery

He was born in Nagpur in India in 1882 into a British "army family". He began his life as a career soldier, joining the Royal Artillery in 1899 in Britain and returning to join the Indian Army with them in 1907.

In the First World War he had a distinguished record, rising to the rank of Lt Colonel in the Royal Artillery as part of the East Africa Campaign. He was Mentioned in Dispatches and won the Croix de Guerre.

After the war, he began writing, mainly on topics concerning Christianity in a scientific world, which linked to his great interest in fossils. His main focus remained the dilemma between Christian beliefs and evolutionary theory, picking up from the Victorian theories of Philip Henry Gosse. In 1930, he was elected a Fellow of the Royal Society of Edinburgh. His proposers were James Ritchie, Murray Macgregor, James Ernest Richey, and Thomas James Jehu. In 1932 he co-founded the Evolution Protest Movement with Douglas Dewar, Bernard Acworth and John Ambrose Fleming (jointly known as the Acworth Circle).

He officially remained in the army until 1933. He then attended university aged 50, graduating with an MA degree from the University of Edinburgh in 1934, going on to receive both a PhD (1938) and DSc (1941).

In the Second World War, he oversaw anti-aircraft batteries involved in coastal defence in the Firth of Forth.

He died in Edinburgh, Scotland, on 22 September 1955 and was buried with his wife, Gwyneth May Davies LRAM (1890–1980) in Grange Cemetery. The grave lies in the modern south-west extension, facing north on the upper section.

The 1976 BBC drama Where Adam Stood parallels his beliefs and dilemmas.

== Publications ==
See

- The Credentials of Jesus (1924)
- The Significance of Modernism (1927)
- The Fossil Fauna of the Samana Range (1930)
- Scientific Discoveries and Their Bearing on the Biblical Account of the Noachian Deluge (1930) (Langhorne Orchard Prize Essay)
- The Dogma of Continuity, The Root of Modernism (1932)
- Tertiary Echinoidea of the Kohat-Potwar Basin (1942)
- Joseph Needham and the Regnum Dei (1943)
- Evolutionists Under Fire (1944)
- Is Evolution a Myth? (1949)
- The Bible and Modern Science (1953)
- The BBC Abuses Its Monopoly
