= Henry Dixon Kimber =

English baronet (1862–1950)

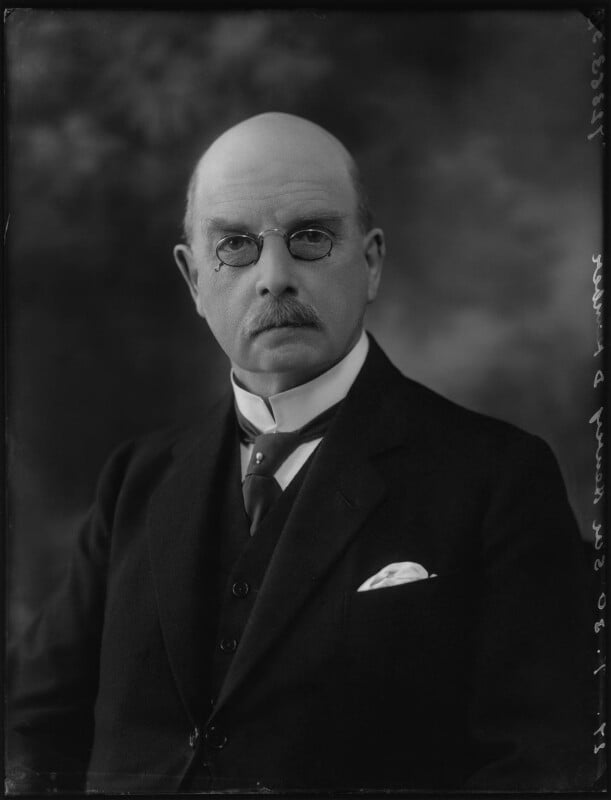
Kimber in 1929

Sir Henry Dixon Kimber, 2nd Baronet (1862–1950) was one of the Kimber baronets. His father, Henry Kimber, was the first member of parliament for Wandsworth, being created a baronet in 1904 after representing the area for almost 30 years.

Kimber hoped to become Lord Mayor of London, but instead became Chief Commoner in which capacity he was responsible for the City of London's property holdings.

Kimber's son by his first marriage was killed in the First World War. His second son was Sir Charles Dixon Kimber, 3rd Baronet who inherited the title in 1950.

Baronetage of the United Kingdom
Preceded by Henry Kimber	Baronet (of Lansdowne Lodge); 1923–1950	Succeeded by Charles Kimber
