= Marcus Samuel (politician) =

British Conservative Party politician

Marcus Reginald Anthony Samuel (7 September 1873 – 3 March 1942) was a British Conservative Party politician.

At the 1929 general election he stood unsuccessfully in Southwark North, losing his deposit. He was elected as the member of parliament (MP) for Putney at a by-election in November 1934 after the death of his relative, Conservative MP Samuel Samuel. He was re-elected in general election in November 1935 and held the seat until his death in March 1942, aged 68.

Parliament of the United Kingdom
Preceded by Samuel Samuel	Member of Parliament for Putney; 1934–1942	Succeeded by Hugh Linstead
