= Creation Science Movement =

The Creation Science Movement (CSM, founded in 1932 as the Evolution Protest Movement) is a British Creationist organisation which lays claim to the title "the oldest creationist movement in the world". It was a member of the Evangelical Alliance until its resignation in 2008. It is a registered charity.

== History ==
The Evolution Protest Movement (EPM) had its roots in the Victoria Institute (or Philosophical Society of Great Britain) whose stated objective was to defend "the great truths revealed in Holy Scripture ... against the opposition of Science falsely so called." Although the Victoria Institute was not officially opposed to evolution, it attracted a number of scientists sceptical of Darwinism. It had its heyday in the late 19th century, but by the 1910s had shrunk considerably, and considerable apathy had set in. Prominent Canadian creationist (and long-standing institute member) George McCready Price, attended meetings regularly while living in London between 1924 and 1928, but his views failed to persuade the membership. Before returning to North America, Price noted that British creationists were "scattered and divided into a number of small, weak, and insignificant groups or societies", and called for them to unify.

In 1932 decorated submariner turned free-lance journalist Bernard Acworth proposed the formation of an anti-evolution society that would confine itself "as far as that might be possible, to the scientific rather than to the philosophic and religious plane". The proposal was seconded by barrister and amateur ornithologist Douglas Dewar, and the Evolution Protest Movement was formed at a meeting between them and five like-minded conservative evangelicals with electrical engineer, physicist and Victoria Institute president John Ambrose Fleming as president, Acworth as chairman and Dewar as secretary-treasurer.

The EPM existed as only a paper organisation until it was publicly launched in February 1935, at a meeting attended by over six hundred. In its early years, Dewar was the main driving force within the EPM, publishing a booklet entitled Man: A Special Creation and engaging in public speaking and debates with supporters of evolution. In the late 1930s he resisted the American creationists call for acceptance of flood geology. Dewar's association with the EPM was to span a quarter century, and saw it grow to about two hundred members, with small branches in Australia and New Zealand. However it failed to win the public endorsement of C.S. Lewis, the most prominent Christian apologist of his day (and a personal friend of Acworth's), though he privately admitted to finding their arguments increasingly compelling.

In the mid 1950s the EPM came under control of schoolmaster/pastor Albert G. Tilney, whose dogmatic and authoritarian style ran the organisation "as a one-man band", unwaveringly promoting Gap creationism and reducing the membership to lethargic inactivity. Entomologist William R. Thompson described it as "largely ignored or ridiculed by both the scientific and ecclesiastical establishments", and several prominent Creationists declined to serve as officers.

In the 1970s, the recent publication of an English edition of The Genesis Flood, the EPM's rejection of flood geology, and Tilney's idiosyncratic scriptural interpretations, led to the formation of rival creationist groups such as the Newton Scientific Association and the Biblical Creation Society. During this time the EPM came to grudging acceptance of flood geology, and a number of young Earth creationists (YEC) joined its council and moved the balance away from Tilney and his allies. It was renamed the Creation Science Movement in 1980. By the mid 1980s it had become overwhelmingly YEC, formally incorporated flood geology into their 'Deed of Trust' (which all officers were required to sign), and condemned Gap and Day-Age Creationism as unscriptural. By the early 1990s it had closed down its foreign branches, but had increased its membership considerably.

The current chairman of the CSM is David Rosevear, who has a Ph.D. in organometallic chemistry from the University of Bristol, United Kingdom and was a senior lecturer in chemistry at Portsmouth University. He is a Young Earth creationist, who when interviewed by the British Broadcasting Corporation has claimed that members of the public are brainwashed by the media into believing in evolution.

== Genesis Expo ==
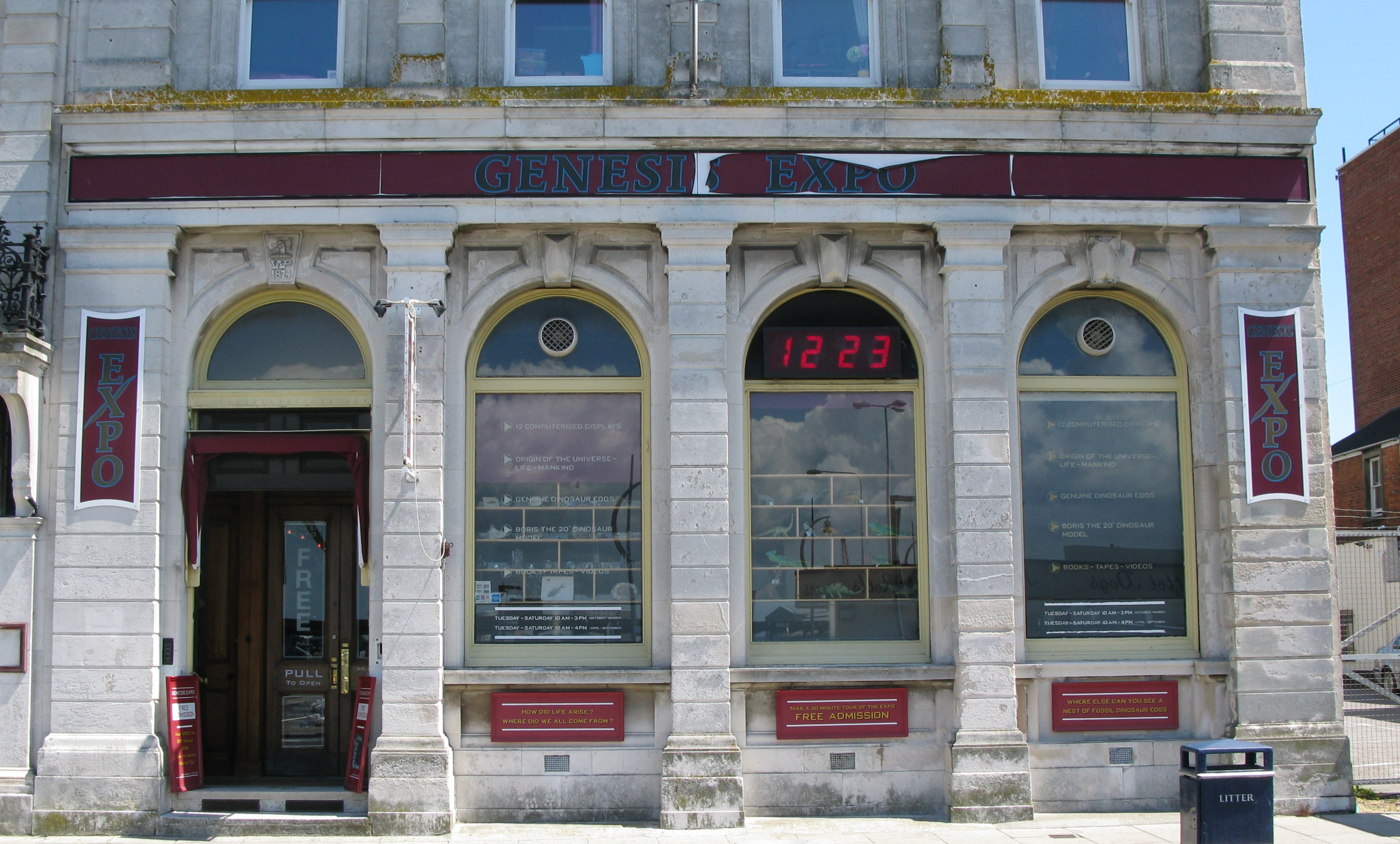
The facade of the Genesis Expo

The CSM's Genesis Exhibition was sited in the old National Provincial Bank on Portsmouth Harbour. It consisted of "12 dioramas and a clutch of real fossilised dinosaur eggs." The dioramas include a mock-up of a gravestone with "Here lies the Theory of Evolution" carved on it.

The Genesis Exhibition was closed in May 2020 in response to social distancing rules brought in due to COVID-19. As of 2026, the exhibition is permanently closed with signs and branding having been removed. There are plans in place for the building, which is Grade-II listed, to be converted into a café on the ground floor and residential units above.

== Notes ==
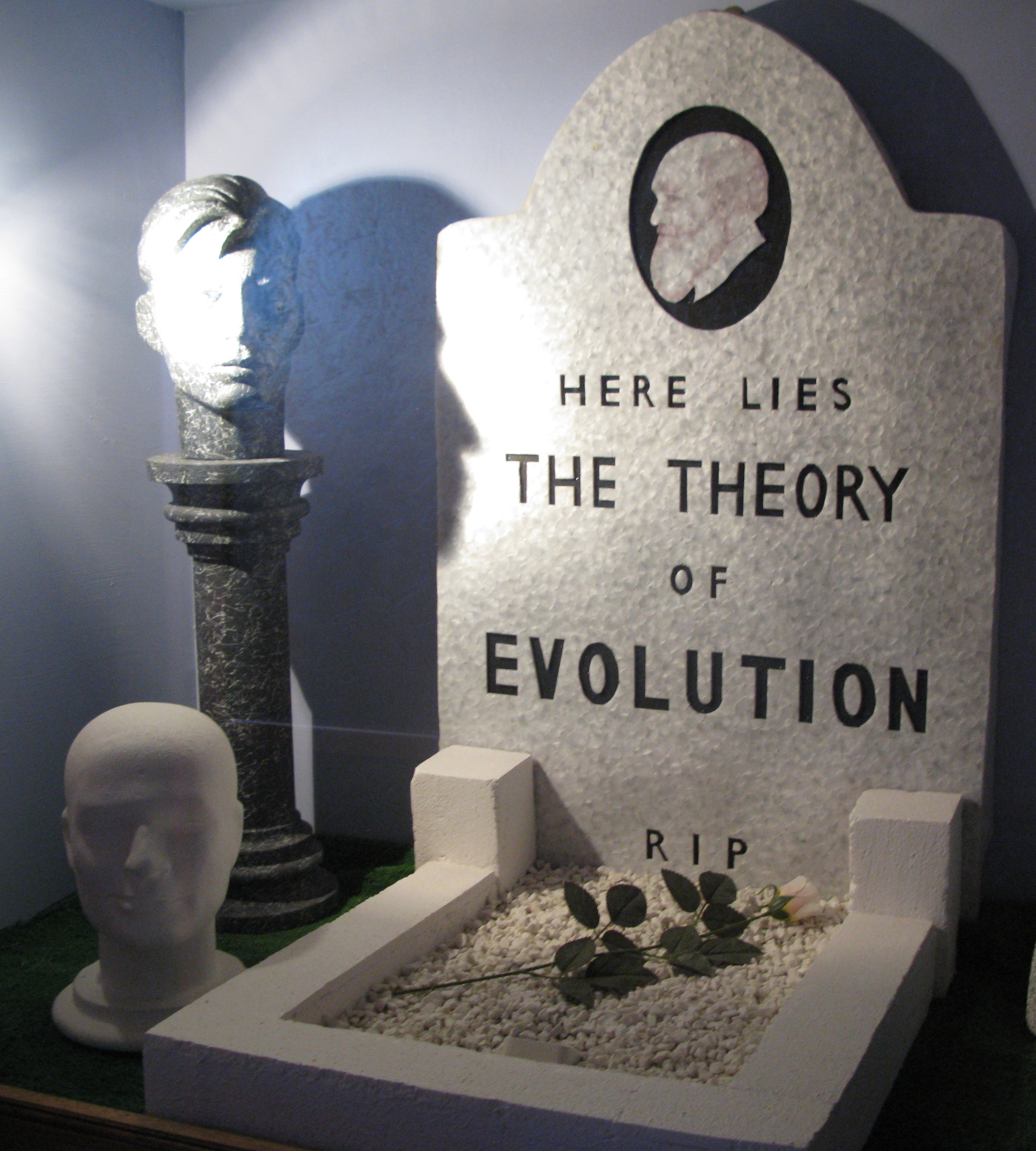
The mock grave at the Genesis Expo
