= Henry Kimber =

British politician

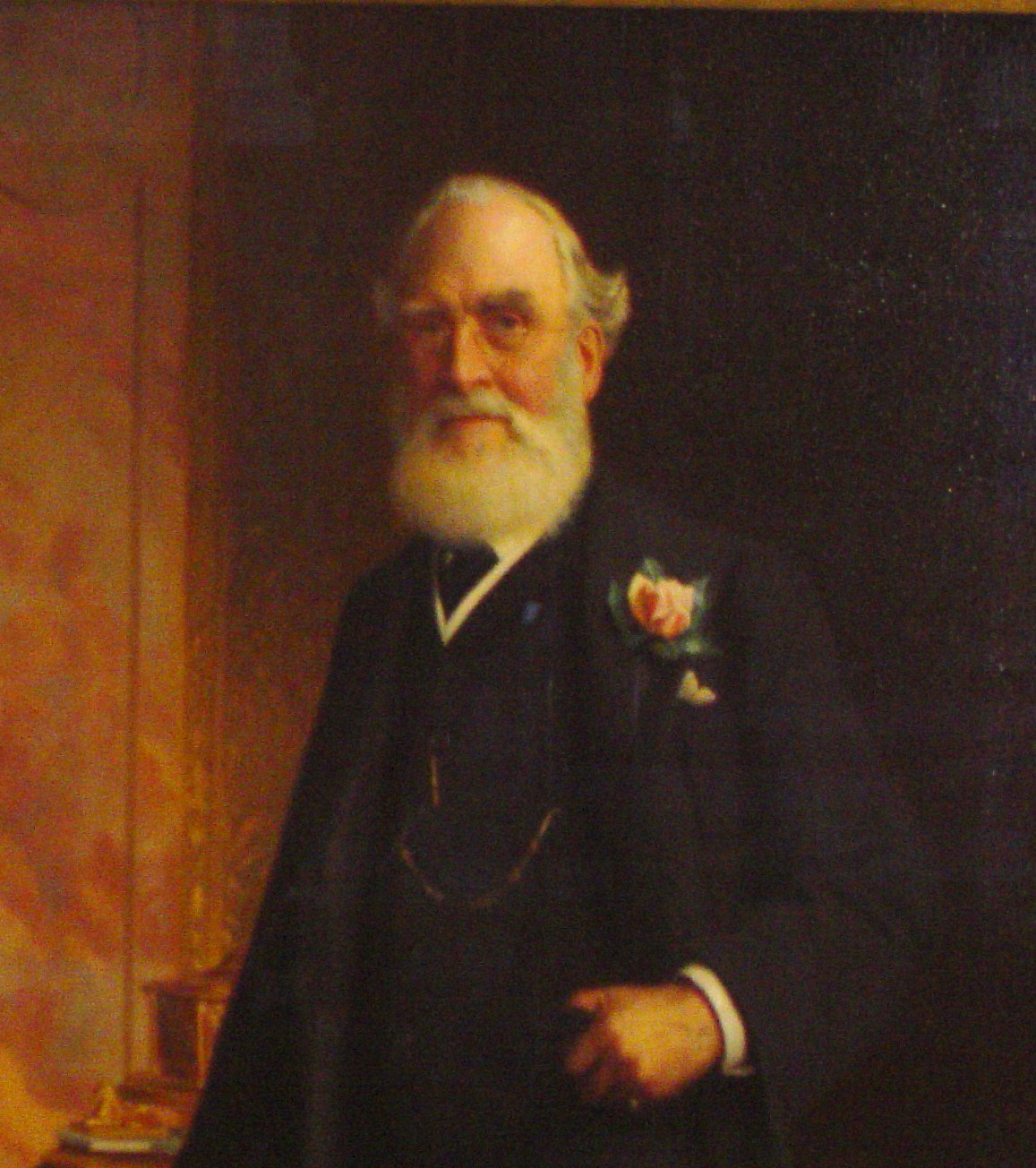
Sir Henry Kimber

Sir Henry Kimber, 1st Baronet (13 July 1834 – 18 December 1923) was a British lawyer and Conservative Party politician who sat in the House of Commons from 1885 to 1913.

Kimber was the son of Joseph Kimber of Canonbury. He was admitted as a solicitor in 1858 and was the founder of the legal firm of Kimber and Ellis. He was a Commissioner of Supreme Courts of all the Australian colonies and some of the states of the U.S.A. His business interests included being a director of the South Indian Railway and chairman of Natal Land and Colonization Co. He was a progressive Conservative and chairman of the Political Committee of City Carlton Club.

At the 1885 general election, Kimber was elected as the member of parliament (MP) for Wandsworth. He held the seat until his resignation in June 1913, by taking the Chiltern Hundreds.

Kimber had a son Lt. Charles Dixon Kimber who fought with the 48th Co. Imperial Yeomanry in The Anglo Boer War. He died near Coligny 17 July 1901, aged. 30

In 1904 he was created a Baronet, of Lansdowne Lodge in Wandsworth in the County of London.

Kimber lived at Lansdowne Lodge, West Hill, Putney Heath. He died in December 1923, aged 89.

Kimber married Mary Adelaide Dixon, daughter of General Charles Dixon, R.E., of Rectory Grove, Clapham, in September 1860.

Kimber is buried at Brookwood Cemetery, near Woking.

== Sources ==
- Kidd, Charles, Williamson, David (editors). Debrett's Peerage and Baronetage (1990 edition). New York: St Martin's Press, 1990,

Parliament of the United Kingdom
New constituency	Member of Parliament for Wandsworth; 1885–1913	Succeeded by Samuel Samuel
Baronetage of the United Kingdom
New creation	Baronet (of Lansdowne Lodge); 1904–1923	Succeeded by Henry Dixon Kimber
