= Solar Frontier =

Japanese manufacturer of CIS thin-film solar modules

Solar Frontier KK
- Type: Subsidiary
- Industry: Engineering
- Founded: 2006 as Showa Shell Solar
- Headquarters: Daiba Frontier Bldg, 2-3-2, Daiba, Minato-ku, Tokyo 135-8074
- Area served: Worldwide
- Key people: Shigeaki Kameda (CEO), Brooks Herring (Director of International Business)
- Products: Solar panels
- Parent: Showa Shell Sekiyu
- Website: www.solar-frontier.com/eng/

Kabushiki Kaisha Solar Frontier is a Japanese photovoltaic company that develops and manufactures thin film solar cells using CIGS technology. It is a fully owned subsidiary of Showa Shell Sekiyu and located in Minato, Tokyo, Japan. The company was founded in 2006 as Showa Shell Solar, and renamed Solar Frontier in April 2010.

== Background ==
Solar Frontier's parent company Showa Shell Sekiyu had been involved with solar energy since 1978. Production on a commercial scale of crystalline silicon modules for solar cells began in 1983, and research on CIS (copper-indium-selenium) technology began in 1993.

== Manufacturing plants ==
Solar Frontier has manufacturing plants in Miyazaki Prefecture, where it develops and manufactures CIS solar panels, that combine CIGS and CIGSe materials. The company emphasizes the fact that it uses neither cadmium (Cd) nor lead (Pb) for its cells. CIGS technology often uses a thin (< 50 nm) CdS buffer layer, and the semiconductor material of rival CdTe-technology itself contains the toxic cadmium (Cd), while conventional crystalline silicon modules use a lead-containing solder material.

The company's largest plant is located at Kunitomi and has been operating since its soft opening in February, 2011, with a production capacity of close to 1 GW per year (900 MW).

In April 2015, Solar Frontier completed the construction of its fourth production plant, the 150-megawatt Tohoku Plant, in Ōhira, Miyagi Prefecture, which started commercial production in June 2016. The latest CIS line technology includes solar modules with conversion efficiencies of over 15%. When compared to the Kunitomi Plant, the Tohoku Plant requires only two-thirds the investment and manpower per megawatt. It also requires only one-third the time to manufacture a CIS solar panel.

== CIS technology ==
CIS stands for the key ingredients copper, indium and selenium. CIS technology, however, uses a material that is a mixture of a solid solution of CIS (CuInSe) and CGS (CuGaSe) containing the element gallium. Depending on the ratio of CIS and CGS the chemical formula for the resulting CIGS semiconductor material is written as CuIn_{x}Ga_{(1-x)}Se_{2}, where the value of x can vary from 1 (pure CIS) to 0 (pure CGS). In addition, Solar Frontier's semiconductor also contains sulfur. It is a tetrahedrally bonded semiconductor, with the chalcopyrite crystal structure. The bandgap varies continuously with x from about 1.0 eV (for copper indium selenide) to about 1.7 eV (for copper gallium selenide). Solar Frontier underlines the fact that their CIS modules generate a higher energy yield (kilowatt-hours per kilowatt-peak) in real world conditions than conventional crystalline silicon modules.

== See also ==
- Copper indium gallium selenide solar cells (CIGS technology)
- Copper indium gallium selenide (CIGS material)
- List of CIGS companies
- Solar power in Japan
- Thin film solar cell
