= 1942 Putney by-election =

UK Parliamentary by-election

The 1942 Putney by-election was held on 8 May 1942. The by-election was held due to the death of the incumbent Conservative MP, Marcus Samuel. It was won by the Conservative candidate Hugh Linstead.

1942 Putney by-election
| Party | Candidate | Votes | % | ±% |
|---|---|---|---|---|
| Conservative | Hugh Linstead | 8,788 | 74.9 | +9.8 |
| Independent | Bernard Acworth | 2,939 | 25.1 | New |
| Majority | | 5,849 | 49.8 | +16.6 |
| Turnout | | 11,727 | 23.0 | −43.5 |
| Registered electors | | 51,066 | | |
| Conservative hold | | Swing | +20.85 | |
