= 1934 Putney by-election =

UK Parliamentary by-election

The 1934 Putney by-election was held on 28 November 1934. The by-election was held due to the death of the incumbent Conservative MP, Samuel Samuel. It was won by the Conservative candidate Marcus Samuel, his elder brother.

1934 Putney by-election
Party	Candidate	Votes	%	±%
Conservative	Marcus Samuel	15,599	54.7	−26.9
Labour	Edith Summerskill	12,936	45.3	+26.9
Majority		2,663	9.4	−53.8
Turnout		28,535	57.5	−8.8
Registered electors		49,642		
Conservative hold		Swing	-26.9	
