= Putney (UK Parliament constituency) =

Parliamentary constituency in the United Kingdom, 1918 onwards

Coordinates: 51.454°N 0.224°W

- Borough constituency for the House of Commons
- Interactive map of boundaries from 2024
- Location within Greater London
- County: Greater London
- Electorate: 73,041 (March 2020)

Current constituency
- Created: 1918; 108 years ago
- Member of Parliament: Fleur Anderson (Labour)
- Seats: One
- Created from: Wandsworth (abolished, divided into four)

Putney is a constituency in Greater London created in 1918 and represented in the House of Commons of the UK Parliament since 2019 by Fleur Anderson of the Labour Party.

Anderson succeeded Justine Greening as Member of Parliament (MP), after Greening announced she would not seek reelection to a fifth term in office. She served as Secretary of State for Transport (2011–2012), Secretary of State for International Development (2012–2016) and Secretary of State for Education (2016–2018) under Prime Ministers David Cameron and Theresa May.

== Constituency profile ==
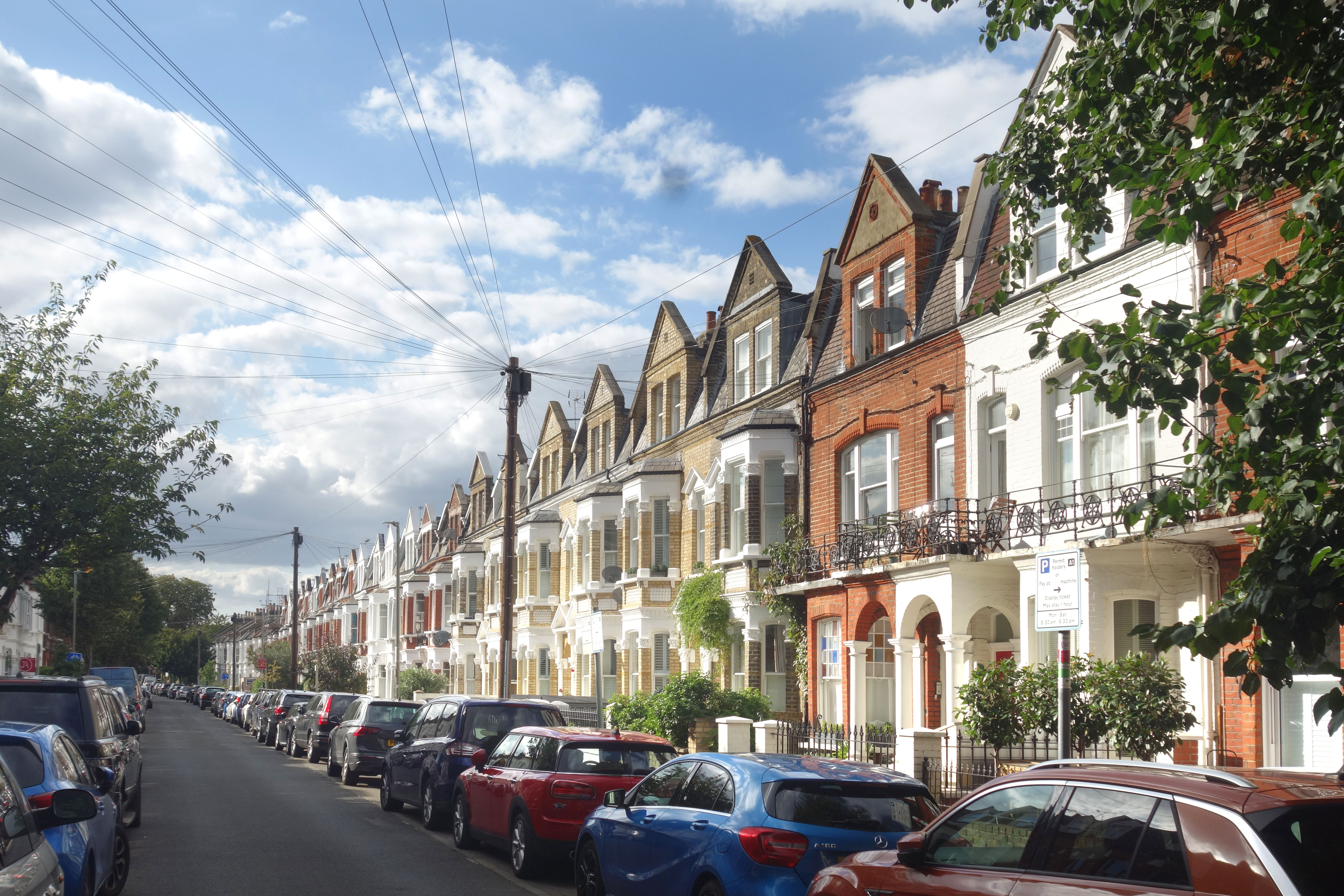
Norroy Road in Putney

Putney is a constituency in Greater London in England, within the Borough of Wandsworth. It covers the areas of Putney, Southfields, Roehampton and parts of Wandsworth.

This is a wealthy, suburban constituency located around 5 miles (8.0 km) south-west of the centre of London. Putney is affluent and contains a mixture of large Victorian houses, dense Edwardian terraces and post-war flats. Roehampton has high levels of deprivation and contains the Alton Estate, one of the UK's largest council estates. The area is also home to the University of Roehampton, which has around 12,000 students. Wandsworth is located on the south bank of the River Thames and most of its industrial docks have been redeveloped into expensive high-rise apartment buildings. House prices across the constituency are higher than the rest of London and the average price is almost triple the UK average.

Putney has a large young adult population and a low proportion of retirees. Residents have high levels of income but low rates of homeownership. The child poverty rate is below-average. Residents are highly-educated and a large proportion work in the accommodation, education and arts sectors. The percentage claiming unemployment benefits is in line with the UK-wide figure. White people made up 69% of the population at the 2021 census. Around a third of the White population are of non-British origin, including large Irish, Italian and Polish communities. Asians made up 12% of residents and Black people were 8%.

Most of the constituency is represented by Conservatives at the local borough council, with some Labour Party councillors elected in the more deprived west. Voters in Putney overwhelmingly supported remaining in the European Union in the 2016 referendum; an estimated 73% voted to remain compared to the UK-wide rate of 48%, making Putney one of the top 25 most remain-supporting constituencies out of 650 across the UK according to Electoral Calculus.

== Boundaries ==
=== Historic ===
1918–1950: The Metropolitan Borough of Wandsworth wards of Putney and Southfields.

1950–1964: The Metropolitan Borough of Wandsworth wards of Fairfield, Putney and Southfields.

Map of boundaries 2010-2024

1964–1974: The Metropolitan Borough of Wandsworth wards of Fairfield, Putney, Southfield, Thamesfield, and West Hill.

1974–1983: The London Borough of Wandsworth wards of Putney, Roehampton, Southfield, Thamesfield, and West Hill.

1983–2010: The London Borough of Wandsworth wards of East Putney, Parkside, Roehampton, Southfields, Thamesfield, West Hill, and West Putney.

2010–2024: As above less Parkside ward.

=== Current ===
Further to the 2023 review of Westminster constituencies, which was based on the ward boundaries in place at 1 December 2020, the composition of the constituency from the 2024 general election was expanded to bring it within the permitted electoral range by including the majority of the Fairfield ward (polling districts FFA, FFB and FFC - incorporating Wandsworth town centre), transferred from Battersea.

Following a local government boundary review which came into effect in May 2022, the Fairfield ward was largely replaced by the Wandsworth Town ward. The constituency now comprises the following wards of the London Borough of Wandsworth from the 2024 general election:

- East Putney; Roehampton; Southfields; Thamesfield; West Hill; West Putney; most of Wandsworth Town; and a small part of St Mary's.

== History ==
Borough of Wandsworth ward map, 1916

When created in 1918 the constituency was carved out of the west of the abolished seat Wandsworth. The rest of the latter formed Wandsworth Central, Balham and Tooting and Streatham. Putney formed one of the divisions of the Parliamentary Borough of Wandsworth.

Political history

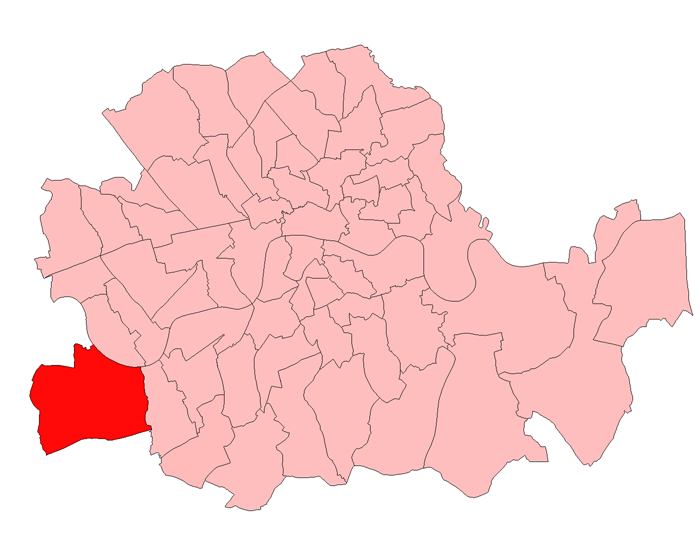
Putney in London, 1918–50

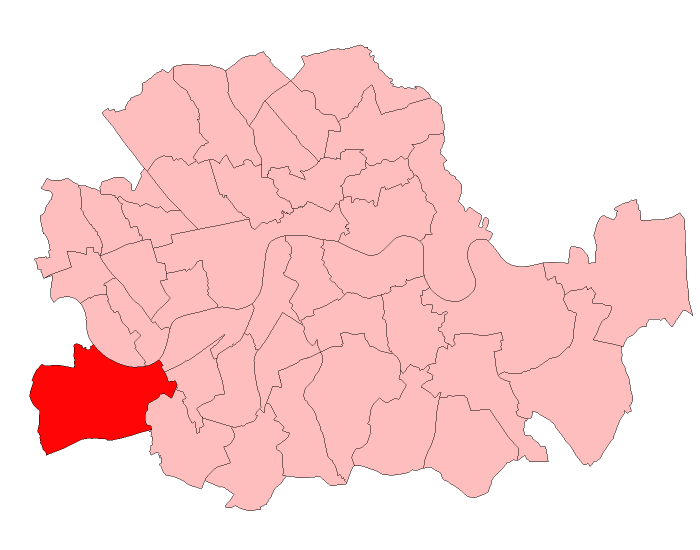
Putney in London, 1950–74

The seat was Conservative from 1918 until 1964, in a national context of Labour marginal wins in the 1920s, the landslide Labour victory in 1945 and the narrower Labour win in 1950. Following the Labour win of 1964, the fairly narrow Heath ministry win of 1970 failed to tip the seat back to the Conservative Party, and the seat was held by Labour for 15 years with Hugh Jenkins as MP.

Putney was next held by Conservative Secretary of State for National Heritage David Mellor from 1979 until 1997 during the party's successive national governments; the 1997 Labour landslide saw Putney gained by Tony Colman (Lab) and a signal early-declared result as the landslide unfolded. (Note: A televised verbal argument occurred between Mellor and Referendum Party candidate Sir James Goldsmith, who held contrasting views on European integration, during Mellor's vote of thanks to the public on his defeat as one of the early declared results in 1997.)

Putney was the first Conservative gain on election night in 2005, when Justine Greening took back the seat from Labour on a two-party swing (Lab-Con) of 6.5%. The 2015 result gave the seat the 148th most marginal majority of the Conservative Party's 331 seats by percentage of majority, similar to the 2010 result. The 2017 election saw Greening re-elected, but with a 10% swing to Labour; this heavy swing against the Conservatives has been attributed to the fact that the Borough of Wandsworth (of which Putney is part) voted 75% in favour of remaining in the European Union in the previous year's referendum. In 2019, Putney was the only seat in the country gained by Labour, amid the worst election results for the party since 1935. Labour would retain the seat in their landslide victory nearly five years later with a larger majority.

== Members of Parliament ==
Election	Member	Party
1918	Samuel Samuel	Coalition Conservative
1922	Samuel Samuel	Unionist
1931	Samuel Samuel	Conservative
1934 by-election	Marcus Samuel	Conservative
1942 by-election	Sir Hugh Linstead	Conservative
1964	Hugh Jenkins	Labour
1979	David Mellor	Conservative
1997	Tony Colman	Labour
2005	Justine Greening	Conservative
September 2019	Justine Greening	Independent
2019	Fleur Anderson	Labour

== Elections ==
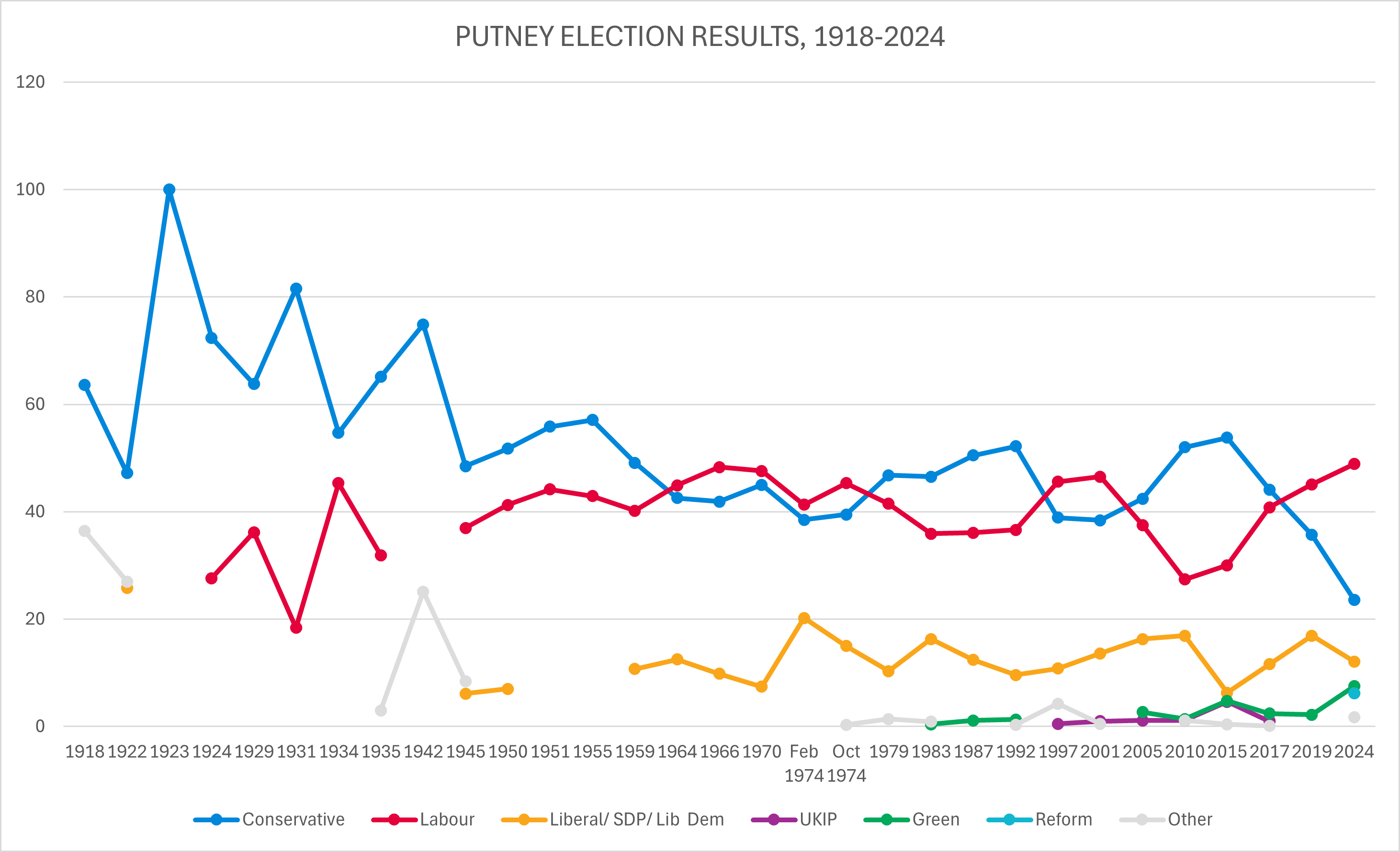
Election results 1918-2024

=== Elections in the 2020s ===
Two weeks after the election, Wandsworth Council reported that 6,558 votes had incorrectly failed to be included in the declared election result on the night, due to a "spreadsheet issue". The council issued revised results on their website. This does not have official effect, as returning officers in the UK do not have the legal power to revise an election result once formally declared unless an election petition is lodged.

2024 general election: Putney (revised result)
Party	Candidate	Votes	%	±%
Labour	Fleur Anderson	24,113	48.9	+4.6
Conservative	Lee Roberts	11,625	23.6	−12.8
Liberal Democrats	Kieren McCarthy	5,943	12.1	−4.8
Green	Fergal McEntee	3,721	7.5	+5.2
Reform	Peter Hunter	3,070	6.2	+6.1
Workers Party	Heiko Khoo	491	1.0	N/A
Rejoin EU	Felix Burford-Connole	332	0.7	N/A
Majority		12,488	25.3	+17.3
Turnout		49,295	67.9	−8.1
Registered electors		72,614		
Labour hold		Swing	▲8.7	

2024 general election: Putney (originally declared result)
Party	Candidate	Votes	%	±%
Labour	Fleur Anderson	20,952	49.0	+4.7
Conservative	Lee Roberts	10,011	23.4	−13.0
Liberal Democrats	Kieren McCarthy	5,189	12.1	−4.8
Green	Fergal McEntee	3,182	7.4	+5.1
Reform	Peter Hunter	2,681	6.3	+6.2
Workers Party	Heiko Khoo	433	1.0	N/A
Rejoin EU	Felix Burford-Connole	289	0.7	N/A
Majority		10,941	25.6	+17.6
Turnout		42,737	58.9	−17.1
Registered electors		72,614		
Labour hold		Swing	▲8.9	

=== Elections in the 2010s ===
2019 notional result
Party	Vote	%
Labour	24,613	44.3
Conservative	20,197	36.4
Liberal Democrats	9,382	16.9
Green	1,298	2.3
Brexit Party	36	0.1
Turnout	55,526	76.0
Electorate	73,041	

2019 general election: Putney
Party	Candidate	Votes	%	±%
Labour	Fleur Anderson	22,780	45.1	+4.3
Conservative	Will Sweet	18,006	35.7	−8.4
Liberal Democrats	Sue Wixley	8,548	16.9	+5.3
Green	Fergal McEntee	1,133	2.2	+0.2
Majority		4,774	9.4	N/A
Turnout		50,467	77.0	+4.9
Registered electors		65,542		
Labour gain from Conservative		Swing	+6.4	

2017 general election: Putney
Party	Candidate	Votes	%	±%
Conservative	Justine Greening	20,679	44.1	−9.7
Labour	Neeraj Patil	19,125	40.8	+10.8
Liberal Democrats	Ryan Mercer	5,448	11.6	+5.3
Green	Ben Fletcher	1,107	2.4	+2.4
UKIP	Patricia Ward	477	1.0	−3.6
Independent	Lotta Quizeen	58	0.1	N/A
Majority		1,554	3.3	+21.5
Turnout		46,894	72.1	+5.1
Registered electors		65,031		
Conservative hold		Swing	-10.2	

2015 general election: Putney
Party	Candidate	Votes	%	±%
Conservative	Justine Greening	23,018	53.8	+1.8
Labour	Sheila Boswell	12,838	30.0	+2.6
Liberal Democrats	Andrew Hallett	2,717	6.3	−10.6
Green	Christopher Poole	2,067	4.8	+3.4
UKIP	Patricia Ward	1,989	4.6	+3.5
Animal Welfare	Guy Dessoy	184	0.4	N/A
Majority		10,180	23.8	−0.9
Turnout		42,813	67.0	+2.6
Registered electors		63,923		
Conservative hold		Swing	-0.4	

2010 general election: Putney
Party	Candidate	Votes	%	±%
Conservative	Justine Greening	21,223	52.0	+9.6
Labour	Stuart King	11,170	27.4	−10.1
Liberal Democrats	James Sandbach	6,907	16.9	+0.6
Green	Bruce Mackenzie	591	1.4	−1.3
BNP	Peter Darby	459	1.1	N/A
UKIP	Hugo Wareham	435	1.1	0.0
Majority		10,053	24.6	+19.8
Turnout		40,785	64.4	+4.9
Registered electors		63,371		
Conservative hold		Swing	+9.8	

=== Elections in the 2000s ===
2005 general election: Putney
Party	Candidate	Votes	%	±%
Conservative	Justine Greening	15,497	42.4	+4.0
Labour	Tony Colman	13,731	37.5	−9.0
Liberal Democrats	Jeremy Ambache	5,965	16.3	+2.7
Green	Keith Magnum	993	2.7	N/A
UKIP	Anthony Gahan	388	1.1	+0.1
Majority		1,766	4.9	N/A
Turnout		36,574	59.5	+3.0
Registered electors		61,499		
Conservative gain from Labour		Swing	+6.50	

2001 general election: Putney
Party	Candidate	Votes	%	±%
Labour	Tony Colman	15,911	46.5	+0.9
Conservative	Michael Simpson	13,140	38.4	−0.5
Liberal Democrats	Anthony Burrett	4,671	13.6	+2.8
UKIP	Pat Wild	347	1.0	+0.5
ProLife Alliance	Yvonne Windsor	185	0.5	N/A
Majority		2,771	8.1	+1.4
Turnout		34,254	56.5	−16.8
Registered electors		60,643		
Labour hold		Swing	+0.6	

=== Elections in the 1990s ===
1997 general election: Putney
Party	Candidate	Votes	%	±%
Labour	Tony Colman	20,084	45.6	+9.0
Conservative	David Mellor	17,108	38.9	−13.3
Liberal Democrats	Russell Pyne	4,739	10.8	+1.2
Referendum	James Goldsmith	1,518	3.5	N/A
UKIP	William Jamieson	233	0.5	N/A
Happiness Stan's Freedom to Party	Lenny Beige (AKA Steve Furst)	101	0.2	N/A
Sportsman's Alliance: Anything but Mellor	Michael Yardley	90	0.2	N/A
Natural Law	John Small	66	0.2	−0.1
Independently Beautiful Party	Ateeka Poole	49	0.1	N/A
Renaissance Democrat	Dorian Van Braam	7	0.02	N/A
Majority		2,976	6.7	N/A
Turnout		43,995	73.3	−4.6
Registered electors		60,015		
Labour gain from Conservative		Swing	+11.2	

1992 general election: Putney
Party	Candidate	Votes	%	±%
Conservative	David Mellor	25,188	52.2	+1.7
Labour	Judith Chegwidden	17,662	36.6	+0.5
Liberal Democrats	John Martyn	4,636	9.6	−2.8
Green	Keith Hagenbach	618	1.3	+0.2
Natural Law	Paul Levy	139	0.3	N/A
Majority		7,526	15.6	+1.2
Turnout		48,243	77.9	+1.9
Registered electors		61,914		
Conservative hold		Swing	+0.6	

=== Elections in the 1980s ===
1987 general election: Putney
Party	Candidate	Votes	%	±%
Conservative	David Mellor	24,197	50.5	+4.0
Labour	Peter Hain	17,290	36.1	+0.2
Liberal	Sally Harlow	5,934	12.4	−3.9
Green	Simon Desorgher	508	1.1	+0.7
Majority		6,907	14.4	+3.8
Turnout		47,929	76.0	+2.4
Registered electors		63,108		
Conservative hold		Swing	+1.9	

1983 general election: Putney
Party	Candidate	Votes	%	±%
Conservative	David Mellor	21,863	46.5	−0.3
Labour	Peter Hain	16,844	35.9	−5.6
Liberal	Charles Welchman	7,668	16.3	+6.0
National Front	Michael Connolly	290	0.6	−0.8
Ecology	Rose Baillie-Grohman	190	0.4	N/A
Socialist (GB)	Leonard Chalk	88	0.2	N/A
Independent	William Williams	41	0.1	N/A
Majority		5,019	10.6	+5.3
Turnout		46,984	73.6	−2.5
Registered electors		63,853		
Conservative hold		Swing	+2.6	

=== Elections in the 1970s ===
1979 general election: Putney
Party	Candidate	Votes	%	±%
Conservative	David Mellor	23,040	46.8	+7.3
Labour	Hugh Jenkins	20,410	41.5	−3.8
Liberal	Nicholas Couldrey	5,061	10.3	−3.7
National Front	James Webster	685	1.4	N/A
Majority		2,630	5.3	N/A
Turnout		49,196	76.1	+4.3
Registered electors		64,648		
Conservative gain from Labour		Swing	+5.6	

October 1974 general election: Putney
Party	Candidate	Votes	%	±%
Labour	Hugh Jenkins	21,611	45.3	+4.0
Conservative	Gerard Wade	18,836	39.5	+1.0
Liberal	Adrian Slade	7,159	15.0	−5.2
More Prosperous Britain	Thomas Keen	125	0.3	N/A
Majority		2,775	5.8	+3.0
Turnout		47,731	71.8	−7.8
Registered electors		66,515		
Labour hold		Swing	+1.55	

February 1974 general election: Putney
Party	Candidate	Votes	%	±%
Labour	Hugh Jenkins	21,680	41.3	−5.1
Conservative	Gerard Wade	20,241	38.5	−7.7
Liberal	Adrian Slade	10,629	20.2	+12.7
Majority		1,439	2.8	+0.2
Turnout		52,550	79.6	+10.8
Registered electors		66,013		
Labour hold		Swing	+1.3	

1970 general election: Putney
Party	Candidate	Votes	%	±%
Labour	Hugh Jenkins	25,162	47.6	−0.7
Conservative	John Wakeham	23,768	45.0	+3.1
Liberal	Geoffrey Broughton	3,887	7.4	−2.6
Majority		1,394	2.6	−3.8
Turnout		52,727	68.8	−10.1
Registered electors		76,722		
Labour hold		Swing	-1.95	

=== Elections in the 1960s ===
1966 general election: Putney
Party	Candidate	Votes	%	±%
Labour	Hugh Jenkins	26,601	48.3	+3.4
Conservative	Hugh Linstead	23,114	41.9	−0.6
Liberal	Adrian Slade	5,420	9.8	−2.7
Majority		3,487	6.4	+4.0
Turnout		55,135	78.9	+1.9
Registered electors		69,870		
Labour hold		Swing	+1.95	

1964 general election: Putney
Party	Candidate	Votes	%	±%
Labour	Hugh Jenkins	24,581	44.9	+4.7
Conservative	Hugh Linstead	23,274	42.54	−6.6
Liberal	Anthony Cowen	6,856	12.5	+1.8
Majority		1,307	2.4	N/A
Turnout		54,711	77.0	−3.1
Registered electors		71,084		
Labour gain from Conservative		Swing	+5.6	

=== Elections in the 1950s ===
1959 general election: Putney
Party	Candidate	Votes	%	±%
Conservative	Hugh Linstead	28,236	49.1	−8.0
Labour	Dick Taverne	23,115	40.2	−2.7
Liberal	Michael Francis Burns	6,166	10.7	N/A
Majority		5,121	8.9	−5.3
Turnout		57,517	80.1	+4.2
Registered electors		71,772		
Conservative hold		Swing	-2.65	

1955 general election: Putney
Party	Candidate	Votes	%	±%
Conservative	Hugh Linstead	28,969	57.1	+1.3
Labour Co-op	Bernard Bagnari	21,774	42.9	−1.3
Majority		7,195	14.2	+2.6
Turnout		50,743	76.0	−5.9
Registered electors		66,776		
Conservative hold		Swing	+1.3	

1951 general election: Putney
Party	Candidate	Votes	%	±%
Conservative	Hugh Linstead	29,686	55.83	+4.07
Labour Co-op	Eric Hutchison	23,489	44.17	+2.93
Majority		6,197	11.6	+1.1
Turnout		53,175	81.9	+0.1
Registered electors		64,933		
Conservative hold		Swing	+0.57	

1950 general election: Putney
Party	Candidate	Votes	%	±%
Conservative	Hugh Linstead	28,007	51.76	+3.22
Labour	Irene Chaplin	22,315	41.24	+4.24
Liberal	Beresford Alton	3,785	7.0	+0.9
Majority		5,692	10.52	−1.0
Turnout		54,107	81.8	+8.2
Registered electors		66,158		
Conservative hold		Swing	-0.51	

=== Elections in the 1940s ===
1945 general election: Putney
Party	Candidate	Votes	%	±%
Conservative	Hugh Linstead	16,356	48.5	−16.6
Labour	Percy D. Stewart	12,469	37.0	+5.1
Common Wealth	Richard Acland	2,686	8.0	N/A
Liberal	Isaac Joseph Hyam	2,041	6.1	N/A
Ind. Conservative	Eleonora Tennant	144	0.4	N/A
Majority		3,887	11.5	−21.7
Turnout		33,696	75.6	+5.1
Registered electors		45,796		
Conservative hold		Swing	-10.85	

1942 Putney by-election
Party	Candidate	Votes	%	±%
Conservative	Hugh Linstead	8,788	74.9	+9.8
Independent	Bernard Acworth	2,939	25.1	N/A
Majority		5,849	49.8	+16.6
Turnout		11,727	23.0	−43.5
Registered electors		51,066		
Conservative hold		Swing	+20.85	

=== Elections in the 1930s ===
1935 general election: Putney
Party	Candidate	Votes	%	±%
Conservative	Marcus Samuel	22,288	65.1	−16.5
Labour	Andrew Aiken Watson	10,895	31.9	+13.5
Independent	Violet Van der Elst	1,021	3.0	N/A
Majority		11,393	33.2	−30.0
Turnout		34,204	68.5	+2.2
Registered electors		49,901		
Conservative hold		Swing	-15.00	

1934 Putney by-election
Party	Candidate	Votes	%	±%
Conservative	Marcus Samuel	15,599	54.7	−26.9
Labour	Edith Summerskill	12,936	45.3	+26.9
Majority		2,663	9.4	−53.8
Turnout		28,535	57.5	−8.8
Registered electors		49,642		
Conservative hold		Swing	-26.9	

1931 general election: Putney
Party	Candidate	Votes	%	±%
Conservative	Samuel Samuel	27,318	81.6	+17.8
Labour	John Lawder	6,172	18.4	−17.8
Majority		21,146	63.2	+25.6
Turnout		33,490	66.3	+4.2
Registered electors		50,538		
Conservative hold		Swing	+17.8	

=== Elections in the 1920s ===
1929 general election: Putney
Party	Candidate	Votes	%	±%
Unionist	Samuel Samuel	19,657	63.8	−8.6
Labour	John Lawder	11,136	36.2	+8.6
Majority		8,521	27.6	−17.2
Turnout		30,793	62.1	−6.3
Registered electors		49,594		
Unionist hold		Swing	-8.6	

1924 general election: Putney
Party	Candidate	Votes	%	±%
Unionist	Samuel Samuel	17,341	72.4	N/A
Labour	John Allen	6,609	27.6	N/A
Majority		10,732	44.8	N/A
Turnout		23,950	68.4	N/A
Registered electors		35,030		
Unionist hold		Swing	N/A	

1923 general election: Putney
Party	Candidate	Votes	%	±%
Unionist	Samuel Samuel	Unopposed		
Registered electors				
Unionist hold				

1922 general election: Putney
Party	Candidate	Votes	%	±%
Unionist	Samuel Samuel	9,739	47.2	−16.4
Ind. Unionist	Cyril Prescott-Decie	5,556	27.0	N/A
Liberal	Henry Higgs	5,317	25.8	N/A
Majority		4,183	20.2	−7.0
Turnout		20,612	61.8	+18.4
Registered electors		33,346		
Unionist hold		Swing	-16.4	

=== Elections in the 1910s ===
1918 general election: Putney
Party		Candidate	Votes	%	±%
C	Unionist	Samuel Samuel	8,677	63.6	
	National	John Jenkins	4,968	36.4	
Majority			3,709	27.2	
Turnout			13,645	43.4	
Registered electors			31,437		
	Unionist win (new seat)				
C indicates candidate endorsed by the coalition government.

== See also ==
- parliamentary constituencies in London
