= Sir Charles Kimber, 3rd Baronet =

British Noble (1912–2008)

Sir Charles Kimber, 3rd Baronet.

Sir Charles Dixon Kimber, 3rd Baronet (7 January 1912 – 10 April 2008) was one of the Kimber baronets.

== Early life and education ==
Charles Dixon Kimber was born at Godstone, Surrey, on 7 January 1912. His father was Henry Dixon Kimber. He was educated at Eton College and Balliol College, Oxford, where he read history. He was at the debate at the Oxford Union in 1933 where the House resolved that it would not fight for King and Country. He was a conscientious objector during the Second World War during which he ran a market garden in Devon. He was secretary of the Labour Party in Totnes.

== Marriage ==
Kimber first married Ursula Bird, the daughter of a member of parliament with whom he had three sons. In 1950, he married Margaret Bazalgette (née Bonham) and the couple had a son and a daughter. The couple divorced in the early 1960s.

== Career ==
Kimber succeeded to the baronetcy in 1950. His father's son by his first marriage was killed in the First World War.

== Death ==
Charles Dixon Kimber died on 10 April 2008. He was survived by two of his sons from his first marriage, and by his daughter from his second marriage. His eldest son, Sir Timothy Roy Henry Kimber, succeeded to the baronetcy.

Baronetage of the United Kingdom
Preceded by Henry Dixon Kimber	Baronet (of Lansdowne Lodge); 1950–2008	Succeeded by Timothy Kimber
