= Wandsworth (UK Parliament constituency) =

Parliamentary constituency in the United Kingdom, 1885–1918

- Former borough constituency for the House of Commons
- County: County of London

1885–1918
- Seats: One
- Created from: East Surrey (one parish of); Mid Surrey (three parishes of)
- Replaced by: Balham and Tooting, Clapham, Putney, Streatham and Wandsworth Central

Wandsworth was the name of a borough constituency created in 1885, abolished in 1918, covering the vast bulk of today's London Borough of Wandsworth in South London but excluding Battersea. It returned one Member of Parliament (MP) to the House of Commons of the UK Parliament (by the first past the post voting system).

The constituency was created by the Redistribution of Seats Act 1885 for the 1885 general election, and abolished for the 1918 general election.

== Boundaries ==
1885–1918: The parishes of Wandsworth, Tooting Graveney, Streatham, and Putney (including Roehampton).

All of the above were in the ancient hundred of Brixton. The first three parishes were previously in Mid Surrey, having been moved out of East Surrey when the Mid Surrey division was created in 1867.

In 1889 the County of London was created. Wandsworth formed part of the new county. In 1900 the Metropolitan Borough of Wandsworth was formed, as a local authority within the County of London. The Metropolitan Borough included a larger area than the parliamentary constituency, as it added Clapham to the areas which had been in the parliamentary borough.

The constituency grouped a number of communities in northern Surrey, which were converted into South London suburbs, due to the rapid expansion of the London conurbation before and during the existence of the constituency. When the County of London was created most of the comparatively empty land within its boundaries became South London.

The shape was irregular — two key masses joined by the comparatively thin, fast-developing Earlsfield area in the middle. In the north-west of the constituency, Putney and central Wandsworth were areas declining somewhat in status in the period. Working class housing was also spreading from the neighbouring area of Battersea, along the part of the south bank of the River Thames included. However, overall the district was middle class in character, with new estates being developed in the south-east end of the seat at Tooting and Streatham (to the south of Clapham).

The neighbouring parliamentary seats were Fulham (on the north bank of the Thames, opposite to the constituency); to the east of the northern part of the seat and to the north of the middle and south-eastern parts were Battersea and Clapham; to the east of the south-eastern part was Norwood; to the south-east of the constituency was Croydon; to the south was Wimbledon and to the west was Kingston.

In 1918 the seat was split up in complex fashion reflecting major urbanisation of the area. The near-whole new offspring were seats of Putney, Streatham and Wandsworth Central and the partial successors were Balham and Tooting and Clapham.

== History ==
The constituency was, throughout its existence, a Conservative seat. The electorate expanded from 10,088 in 1885 to 39,911 in 1913, without altering the partisan leanings of the area.

The first MP for the seat was Henry Kimber, who was created a baronet in 1904. Kimber was a solicitor by profession. He continued to represent the constituency until he resigned in 1913. Even during the 1906 general election, which was a national Liberal landslide, Kimber only had his majority reduced to 545 (2.2%).

In the 1913 by-election the Conservative candidate, businessman Samuel Samuel, defeated the Liberal-Labour former MP for Middlesbrough (UK Parliament constituency) - Joseph Havelock Wilson. Samuel continued to hold the seat until the constituency was split up in the 1918 redistribution.

== Members of Parliament ==
Election	Member	Party
1885	Sir Henry Kimber, Bt	Conservative
1913 by-election	Samuel Samuel	Conservative
1918	constituency abolished	

== Election results ==
=== Elections in the 1880s ===
Wallace

General election 1885: Wandsworth
Party	Candidate	Votes	%	±%
Conservative	Henry Kimber	4,459	57.6	
Liberal	Robert Wallace	3,283	42.4	
Majority		1,176	15.2	
Turnout		7,742	76.7	
Registered electors		10,088		
Conservative win (new seat)				

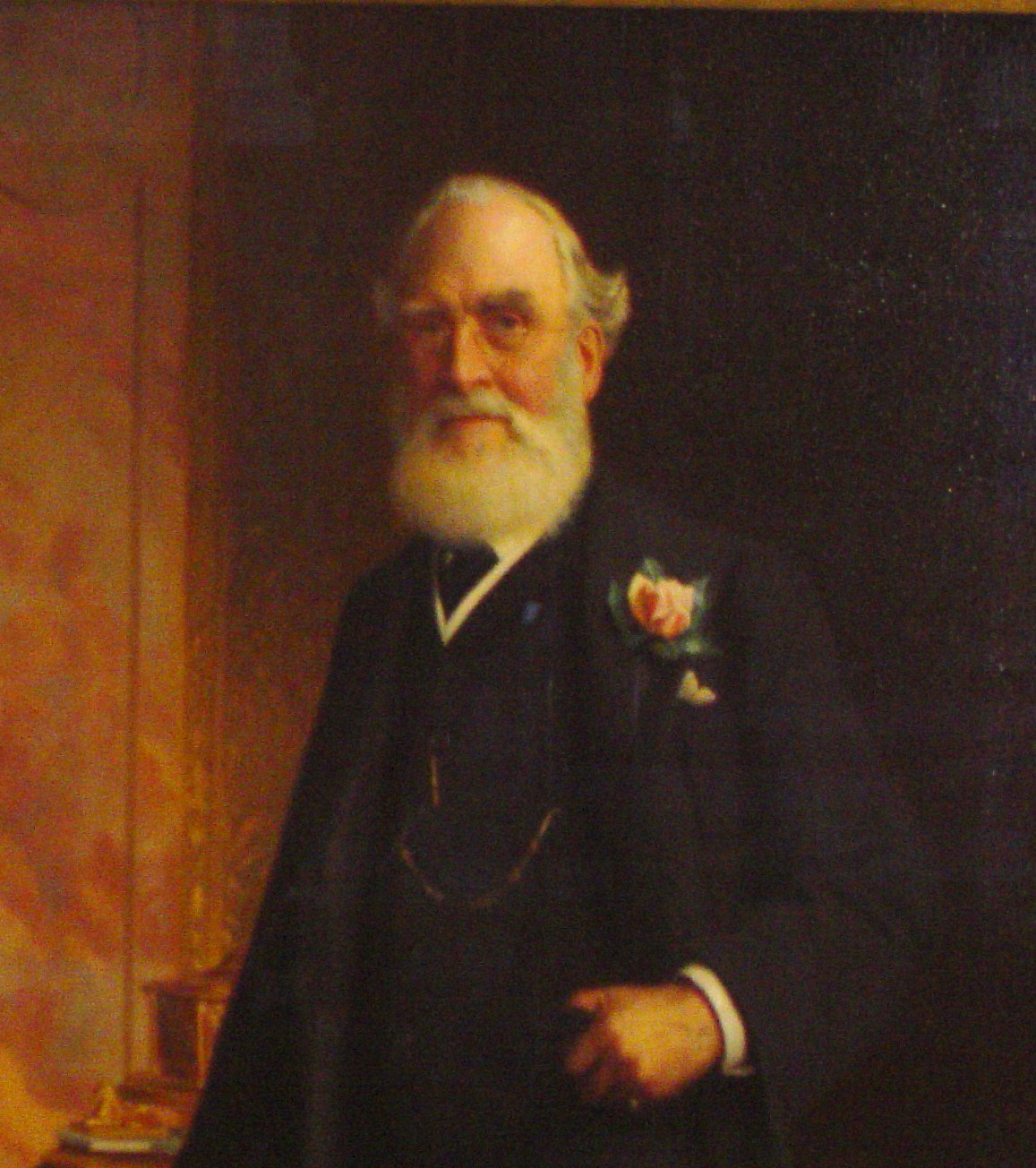
Kimber

General election 1886: Wandsworth
Party	Candidate	Votes	%	±%
Conservative	Henry Kimber	Unopposed		
Conservative hold				

=== Elections in the 1890s ===
General election 1892: Wandsworth
Party	Candidate	Votes	%	±%
Conservative	Henry Kimber	5,913	61.6	N/A
Liberal	William Montgomery Crook	3,690	38.4	New
Majority		2,223	23.2	N/A
Turnout		9,603	64.3	N/A
Registered electors		14,936		
Conservative hold		Swing	N/A	

General election 1895: Wandsworth
Party	Candidate	Votes	%	±%
Conservative	Henry Kimber	6,487	66.6	+5.0
Liberal	Mark Mayhew	3,248	33.4	−5.0
Majority		3,239	33.2	+10.0
Turnout		9,735	57.0	−7.3
Registered electors		17,075		
Conservative hold		Swing	+5.0	

=== Elections in the 1900s ===
General election 1900: Wandsworth
Party	Candidate	Votes	%	±%
Conservative	Henry Kimber	Unopposed		
Conservative hold				

General election 1906: Wandsworth
Party	Candidate	Votes	%	±%
Conservative	Henry Kimber	12,433	51.1	N/A
Liberal	Albert E. Reed	11,888	48.9	New
Majority		545	2.2	N/A
Turnout		24,321	77.5	N/A
Registered electors		31,398		
Conservative hold		Swing	N/A	

=== Elections in the 1910s ===
General election January 1910: Wandsworth
Party	Candidate	Votes	%	±%
Conservative	Henry Kimber	18,188	56.9	+5.8
Liberal	Walter Richard Warren	13,749	43.1	−5.8
Majority		4,439	13.8	+11.6
Turnout		24,321	77.5	0.0
Conservative hold		Swing	+5.8	

General election December 1910: Wandsworth
Party	Candidate	Votes	%	±%
Conservative	Henry Kimber	15,168	59.0	+2.1
Liberal	James Fairbairn	10,554	41.0	−2.1
Majority		4,614	18.0	+4.2
Turnout		25,722	66.8	−10.7
Conservative hold		Swing	2.1	

1913 Wandsworth by-election
Party	Candidate	Votes	%	±%
Unionist	Samuel Samuel	13,425	65.4	+6.4
Lib-Lab	Havelock Wilson	7,088	34.6	−6.4
Majority		6,337	30.8	+12.8
Turnout		20,513	51.4	−15.4
Unionist hold		Swing	+6.4	

General Election 1914–15:

Another General Election was required to take place before the end of 1915. The political parties had been making preparations for an election to take place and by July 1914, the following candidates had been selected;

- Unionist: Samuel Samuel
- Liberal:

== Sources ==
- Boundaries of Parliamentary Constituencies 1885-1972, compiled and edited by F.W.S. Craig (Parliamentary Reference Publications 1972)
- Social Geography of British Elections 1885-1910. by Henry Pelling (Macmillan 1967)
- Who's Who of British Members of Parliament, Volume II 1886-1918, edited by M. Stenton and S. Lees (Harvester Press 1978)
- Who's Who of British Members of Parliament, Volume III 1919-1945, edited by M. Stenton and S. Lees (Harvester Press 1979)
