= Samuel Samuel =

British businessman and politician

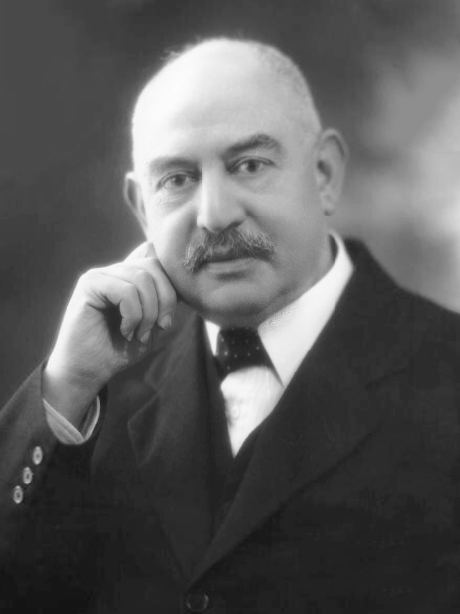
- Born: 7 April 1855; London, England
- Died: 23 October 1934 (aged 79)
- Known for: Founder, Samuel Samuel & Co; Founder, The "Shell" Transport and Trading Company
- Relatives: Marcus Samuel (brother); Walter Samuel (nephew); Nellie Ionides (niece)

Samuel Samuel (7 April 1855 – 23 October 1934) was a British businessman and Conservative Party politician. He sat in the House of Commons from 1913 to 1934, and had extensive investments in East Asia. He was one of the founders of the company that would become Shell.

== Biography ==
Samuel, born in London, into an Iraqi Jewish family who settled in the East End of London, founded Samuel Samuel & Co in Yokohama, Japan, in partnership with his elder brother Marcus Samuel, creator of the Shell Transport and Trading company. The opening of this trading company helped pave the way for the industrialization of Japan, and Japan's thirst for fuel.

Samuel unsuccessfully contested Leeds West at the 1906 and January 1910 general elections, and was unsuccessful again in Sunderland at the December 1910 general election.

He was elected as the Member of Parliament (MP) for Wandsworth at a by-election in June 1913, following the resignation of Sir Henry Kimber, Bt. The constituency was divided at the 1918 general election, when he was returned as a Coalition Conservative for the new Putney division of Wandsworth. He held the seat until his death on 23 October 1934, aged 79.

Parliament of the United Kingdom
Preceded by Sir Henry Kimber	Member of Parliament for Wandsworth; 1913–1918	Constituency abolished
New constituency	Member of Parliament for Putney; 1918–1934	Succeeded by Marcus Samuel
Preceded by C. W. Bowerman	Oldest Member of Parliament; 1931–1934	Succeeded by Edward Fielden
