= Douglas Dewar =

British civil servant (1875–1957)

Douglas Dewar (28 May 1875 – 13 January 1957) was a barrister, British civil servant in India, and ornithologist who wrote several books about Indian birds. He wrote widely in newspapers such as The Madras Mail, Pioneer, Times of India and periodicals such as the Civil and Military Gazette and Bird Notes. He became an active anti-evolutionist and was a founding member of the Evolution Protest Movement.

== Biography ==
Douglas was born in London where his physician father Dewar practised at Sloane Street and Hampton Wick. He studied natural science at Jesus College, Cambridge, before joining the Indian civil service in 1898. Dewar married Edith, daughter of Alfred Rawles on 7 March 1902 at Bombay. He was posted Accountant General in Punjab from 1921 to 1924.

Dewar however wrote most on ornithology and wrote numerous books on the birds of India. He particularly favoured the study of birds in life and wrote in his Birds of the Plains:

"The ornithological world is peopled by two classes of human beings. There are those who study nature inside the museum with the microscope and scalpel and there are those who live to observe birds In the open and study their habits."

He accused museum ornithologists of needlessly multiplying species, altering names, and paying too much attention to local variations.

In his early education, he had been taught the ideas of evolution and was half-hearted in his acceptance of the principles. Although his early works on ornithology seemed to accept ideas of adaptation and selection, he later became a creationist and published a number of books and debates attacking evolution, and was the founding secretary-treasurer in the Evolution Protest Movement in 1932 along with Bernard Acworth and Lewis Merson Davies, jointly known as the Acworth Circle. He leaned towards the idea of old Earth creationism but questioned radiometric dating. His book, The Transformist Illusion published posthumously in 1957 attempted to show the failure of evolution using examples such as the infinitesimal probability of proteins arising out of random mixing, the fossil record, bird anatomy, blood group incompatibilities, and queried evolutionary claims in embryology and vestigial organs. Reviewers pointed out the problems in his objections.

The Dewars had three sons who died before them. The youngest, Douglas died in 1939 and was buried at Frimley. The second John, died in 1940 and their eldest son Kenyon died in 1942. Only their daughter, Millicent, who at one point was engaged to Walter Trevenen Waldron lived beyond them, in the end never marrying.

== Writings ==
Dewar wrote several books mainly on the birds of India, numerous articles in newspapers and other periodicals and later in life wrote critiques on the theory of evolution.

- (1903) Animals of no importance
- (1905) The Indian Crow: His Book. Madras: Higginbotham.
- (1906) Bombay ducks; an account of some of the every-day birds and beasts found in a naturalist's Eldorado.
- (1908) Birds of the plains.
- (1909) The making of species. London, New York, J. Lane Company. (with Frank Finn
- (1910) Indian birds; being a key to the common birds of the plains of India
- (1911) Notes on the English pre-mutiny records in the United Provinces
- (1912) Jungle Folk. Indian natural history sketches. John Lane, London.
- (1913) Glimpses of Indian birds.
- (1915) Birds of the Indian hills.
- (1916) A bird calendar for northern India.
- (1920) In the days of the Company. Calcutta : Thacker, Spink & Co.
- (1920?) A handbook to the English pre-Mutiny records in the Government Record Rooms of the United Provinces of Agra and Oudh.
- (1922) Bygone days in India
- (1923) Himalayan and Kashmiri birds, being a key to the birds commonly seen in summer in the Himalayas & Kashmir
- (1923) The Common Birds of India. Volume 1 & 2. Thacker, Spink & Co., Calcutta.
- (1923) Birds at the Nest. London: John Lane.
- (1925) Indian Bird Life: John Lane.
- (1929) Birds of an Indian Village. Oxford University Press.
- (1931) Difficulties of the Evolution Theory London : E. Arnold & co.
- (1936) Man: a special creation. London: Thynne.
- (1938) More Difficulties of the Evolution Theory. London: Thynne.
- (1944) Obsessions Of Biologists. Evolution Protest Movement.
- (1947) Is evolution proved? A debate between Douglas Dewar and H.S. Shelton. With an introd. by the editor, Arnold Lunn. London: Hollis and Carter with H.S. Shelton and Arnold Lunn
- (1949) Is evolution a myth? : a debate between Douglas Dewar, L. Merson Davies and J.B.S. Haldane, London: C.A. Watts/Paternoster Press.
- (1957) The Transformist Illusion. Murfreesboro, Tennessee: Dehoff Publications
