= Edward White (Free-Church minister) =

Edward White (1819–1898) was a leading London Free Church minister. He was brother of George Frederick White (1817–1898). He was one of the several Free Church ministers to write in favour of Christian mortalism.

== Works ==
- Life in Christ: A Study of the Scripture Doctrine On the Nature of Man, the Object of the Divine Incarnation, and the Conditions of Human Immortality. 1878
