= Samuel Samuel & Co =

Trading company in Japan

Samuel Samuel & Co, was a trading company founded in Yokohama, Japan, by Samuel Samuel in partnership with his elder brother Marcus Samuel, creator of the Shell Transport and Trading company. The opening of this trading company helped pave the way for the industrialization of Japan.

By June 1912, Samuels, Samuels & Company was operating in Taipei Formosa (then occupied by Japan) and it is also listed as Samuel, Samuel & Co., Ltd. in Taipei Formosa.

== See also ==
- List of trading companies
