= Bernard Acworth =

English sailor and author

Captain Bernard Acworth DSO
- Acworth in 1934
- Military career
- Allegiance: United Kingdom
- Branch: Royal Navy Submarine service
- Service years: 1905–1931
- Rank: Captain

Captain Bernard Acworth DSO (3 February 1885 – 16 February 1963) was an English submariner, writer, evangelical Christian and creationist.

== Biography ==
Acworth was trained at the Royal Naval College, Greenwich, becoming a submariner during the First World War and was appointed a Companion of the Distinguished Service Order in 1917. After retiring from the Royal Navy, he became a journalist and unsuccessful parliamentary candidate (in 1931 as a Liberal at Pontypridd and as an Independent at Putney in 1942). In 1932 Acworth, Douglas Dewar, Lewis Merson Davies and Sir Ambrose Fleming launched the Evolution Protest Movement (later named the Creationist Science Movement), which was dedicated to opposing the teaching of evolution as a scientific fact. Acworth also corresponded with C. S. Lewis regarding his views on the incompatibility of evolution and Christianity.

Acworth published some idiosyncratic views on biological matters. He claimed that birds, and other aerial migrants such as butterflies, do not migrate purposefully over particular routes, but wander aimlessly, their apparent routes a result of the prevailing winds at different seasons. He also believed that parasitic cuckoos are hybrids between male cuckoos and the females of the host species.

== Reception ==
His book This Bondage: A Study Of The "Migration" Of Birds, Insects, And Aircraft received positive reviews in two science journals. For example the British Medical Journal described it as a "charming work that will be welcomed by all his fellow bird lovers for the very clear exposition which it contains of the principles of bird flight." A more critical review in The Auk criticized the book for trying to discredit the evidence for evolution and noted that:

He fails to take the physical fact of inertia sufficiently into consideration, nor does he grant to most birds the superiority over normal meteorological conditions which they undoubtedly have. He builds up an elaborate theory in which zoological dispersal, migration, and other natural phenomena are dependent ultimately upon temperature plus the winds. While his deductions and reasoning are not without considerable value, they are undoubtedly of most value to one capable of realizing the weakness of Commander Acworth's ornithological information... In developing his own special theories he sets up one straw man after another and succeeds to his satisfaction in knocking it down.

A review of his Bird and Butterfly Mysteries in the journal Bird-Banding was also negative:

The kindest possible appraisal of Captain Acworth's theories of migration is that they might be true if birds acted in the way he thinks they do and if they flew in an atmosphere in which there was no turbulence and in which the only winds were the prevailing winds of the climatic charts. But his theories do not hold in the imperfect real world in which ornithologists must work.

Acworth received criticism from naturalists for not being a field observer, something which he confessed to. His arm-chair speculations such as his unorthodox ideas about cuckoos were disproven by observational research.

== Publications ==
Books authored by Acworth include:

- 1929 – This Bondage: A Study of the "Migration" of Birds, Insects, and Aircraft, with some Reflections on "Evolution" and Relativity. ASIN B0006AKPPY
- 1930 – The Navies of Today and Tomorrow. A Study of the Naval Crisis from Within. Eyre and Spottiswoode: London.
- 1932 – Back to the Coal Standard: The Future of Transport and Power. Eyre and Spottiswoode: London.
- 1934 – The Navy and the Next War. A Vindication of Sea Power. Eyre and Spottiswoode: London.
- 1934 – This Progress: The Tragedy of Evolution. Rich & Cowan: London.
- 1935 – The Restoration of England’s Sea Power. Eyre and Spottiswoode: London.
- 1937 – Britain in Danger: An Examination of Our New Navy.
- 1940 – How the War Will Be Won. Eyre and Spottiswoode: London.
- 1940 – What We Are Fighting For. Eyre and Spottiswoode: London.
- 1940 – The Navy’s Here! Raphael Tuck Books: London.
- 1940 – Life in a Submarine. Raphael Tuck Books: London.
- 1944 – The Cuckoo and Other Bird Mysteries. Eyre and Spottiswoode: London.
- 1947 – Butterfly Miracles and Mysteries. Eyre and Spottiswoode: London.
- 1947 – Swift: A Study. Eyre and Spottiswoode: London.
- 1955 – Bird and Butterfly Mysteries: Realities of Migration. Eyre and Spottiswoode: London.
