= Upton House, Warwickshire =

Upton House
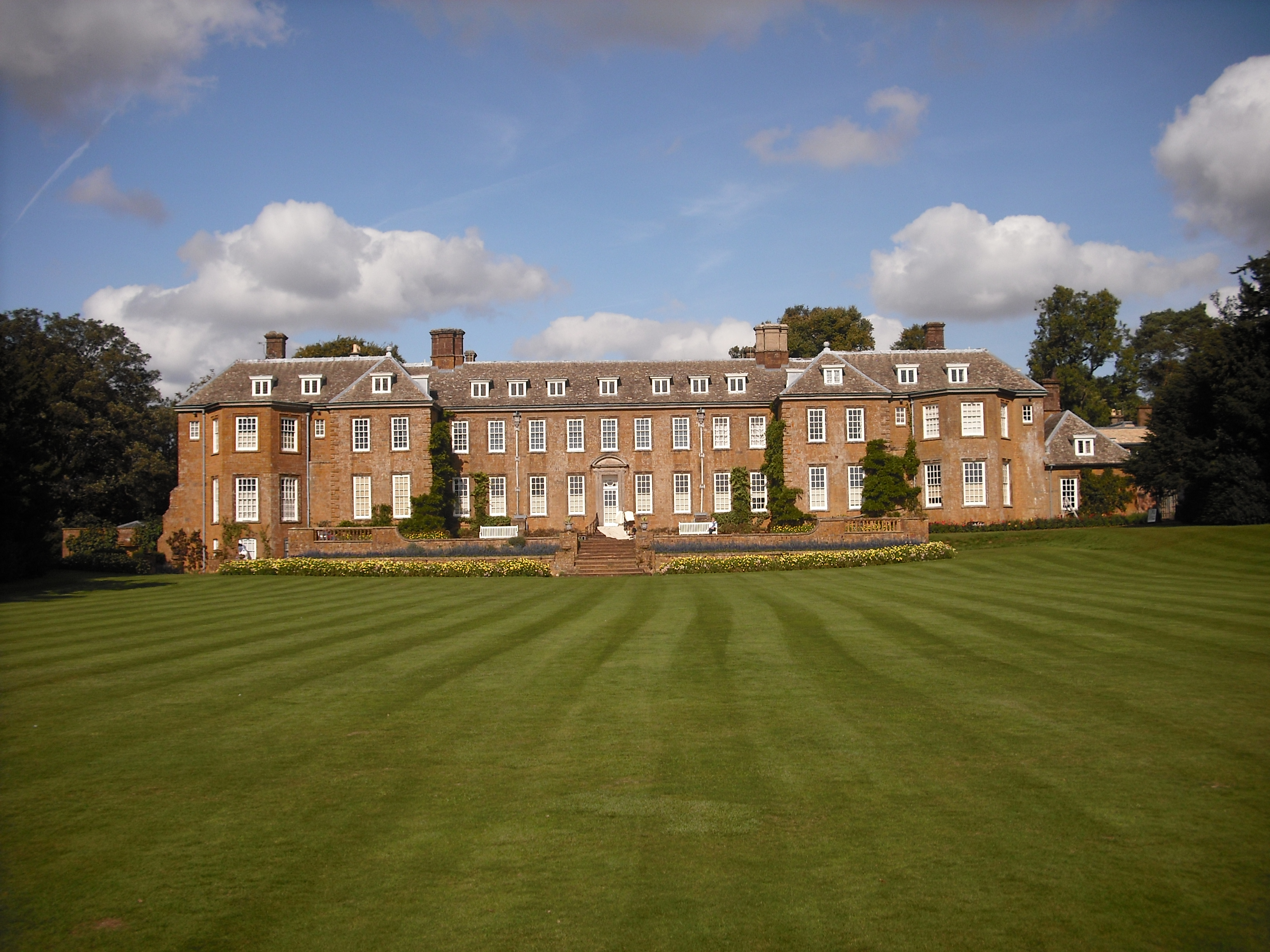
- The South Terrace

- Location within Warwickshire

General information
- Type: Stately home
- Location: near Banbury, Oxfordshire
- Coordinates: 52.11199°N 1.45966°W
- Completed: Built c.1695
- Owner: in the care of the National Trust

Website
- https://www.nationaltrust.org.uk/upton-house-and-gardens

Listed Building – Grade II*
- Designated: 07 January 1952
- Reference no.: 1024175

Upton House is a country house in the civil parish of Ratley and Upton, in the English county of Warwickshire, about 7 miles (11 km) northwest of Banbury, Oxfordshire. It is in the care of the National Trust. The house is Grade II* listed as are the park and gardens.

== History ==
The house was built on the site of the hamlet of Upton, which was destroyed in about 1500 when the land was cleared for pasture. The estate passed through various hands until the early 17th century when it was bought by Sir William Danvers. It remained with the Danvers family until 1688 when Sir Rushout Cullen purchased the estate for £7,000 (equivalent to £1,510,000 in 2025). Cullen built the house for himself in about 1695.

In 1757 the house was bought by banker Francis Child for use as a hunting lodge and it remained with his heirs in the Jersey family until the end of the 19th century when it was held by George Child Villiers, 5th Earl of Jersey. In 1897, the estate was bought by brewer Andrew Richard Motion, grandfather of the writer Andrew Motion. In 1927 the estate was acquired by Walter Samuel, 2nd Viscount Bearsted, who inherited a fortune from his father Marcus Samuel, 1st Viscount Bearsted, the founder of the oil company Shell Transport & Trading. His wife Lady Bearsted worked with "Kitty" Lloyd Jones to transform the house's garden during the early 1930s. Kitty is credited for converting an area of marshland into the bog garden, centred on a natural spring in the garden.

Lord Bearsted donated the house, gardens and art collection to the National Trust in 1948. Lord Bearsted's son, Marcus Samuel, 3rd Viscount Bearsted, lived at Upton from 1948 until his death in 1986 and added to the gift to the National Trust the collection of porcelain. On the death of the 3rd Viscount, the furniture and other items on view in the rooms were offered to the nation by his daughter, Mrs. R. Waley-Cohen, through the 'in lieu' system, on condition that they remain at Upton and on view to the public. Mrs. Waley-Cohen continued to live in the house until 1988, when the family moved to another property on the estate. In October 1991, she offered for sale by public auction, a large number of items which were considered surplus to requirements. The sale, by Christie's, took place at the house, in a total of 1083 separate lots, and included pictures, furniture, porcelain, silver, objects and carpets.

== Description ==
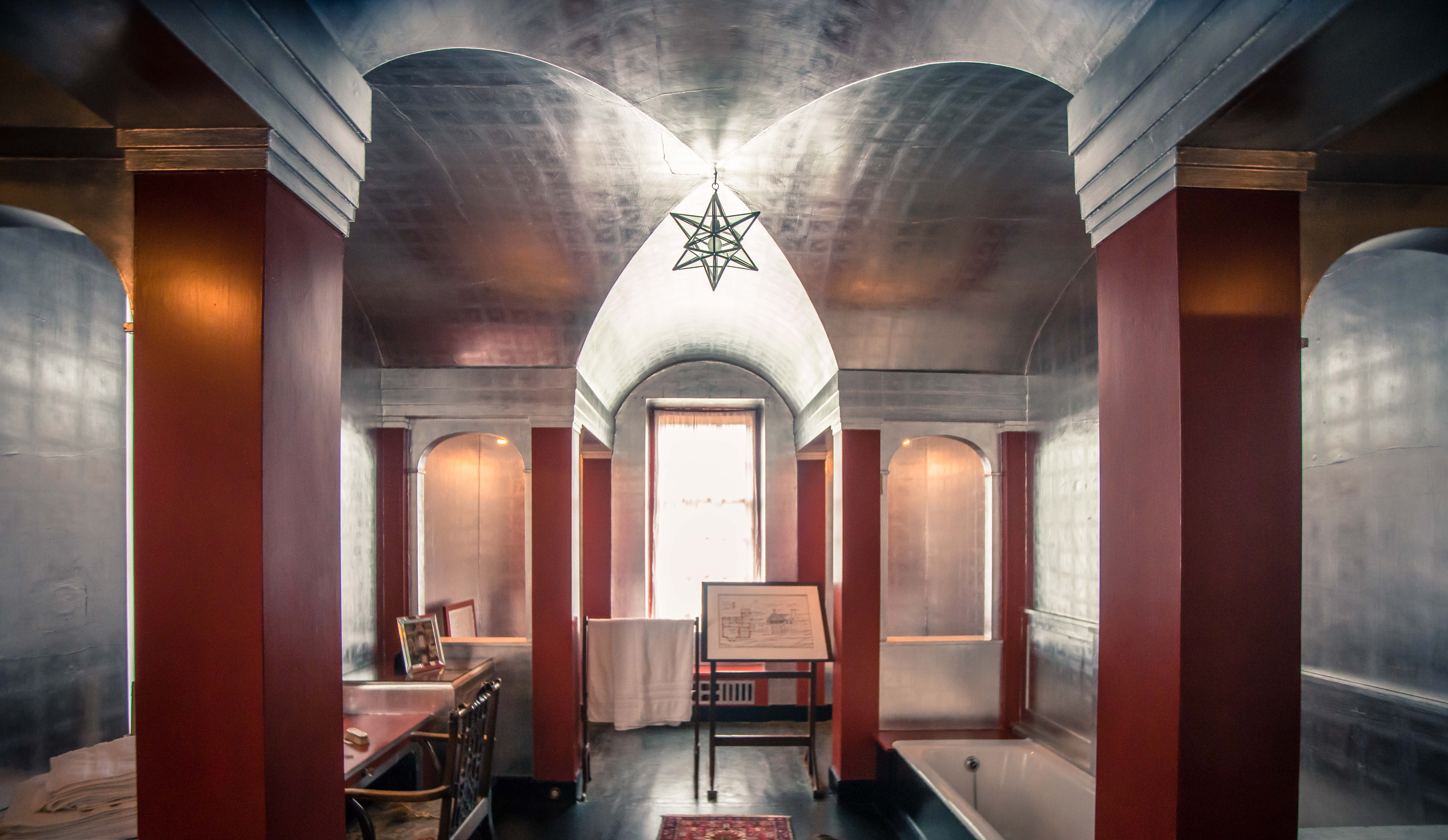
Art-deco style bathroom

Upton is a long low house built of local yellow ironstone. It was considerably expanded from 1927 to 1929 for the 2nd Viscount Bearsted by Percy Richard Morley Horder who retained the Carolean style appearance of the exterior while introducing some Art Deco elements in the interior, particularly in the bathroom for Lady Bearsted, where the walls are covered in aluminium leaf. The style of interiors at Upton has been described by art critic Osbert Lancaster as Curzon Street Baroque.

Footage of front and rear of the house

A main attraction of Upton is the garden. A lawn, with huge cedar trees, sweeps gently down from the house and below is an extensive terraced garden. The garden features a kitchen garden, a series of herbaceous borders and a large lake with water lilies in a small valley. The terracing, unseen from the house and on a first visit unsuspected, contains the National Collection of Aster. In use since the 12th century, the gardens were largely transformed by Kitty Lloyd-Jones for Lady Bearsted in the 1920s and 1930s, including the creation of a rare Bog Garden on the site of medieval fish ponds.

== Art collection ==
Perhaps uniquely among country houses owned by the National Trust, its significance lies principally in its art collection. The house is presented more as an art gallery than as a private home, although care has been taken to restore the house to how it looked in the 1930s. It contains a unique Art Deco bathroom and a collection of early Shell advertising posters, together with some of their original artwork, by such artists as Rex Whistler.

The collection was assembled by Lord Bearsted, helped by his being a Trustee of the National Gallery as well as Chairman of the Whitechapel Gallery. In 1948, Lord Bearsted lent his Old Masters collection for an exhibition in Whitechapel, despite the area still being in ruins from the Blitz. Lord Bearsted's sister Nellie Ionides also became an avid collector, particularly in the area of porcelain. The collection at Upton includes English and Continental old masters such as: Giovanni Battista Tiepolo, Anthony Devis, Francesco Guardi, Jan Steen, Melchior d'Hondecoeter, Thomas Gainsborough, Joshua Reynolds, Tintoretto and Rogier van der Weyden. There is also a collection of English fine porcelain, including Chelsea, Derby, Bow and Worcester, as well as some French Sèvres.

Highlights of the collection include:

- Self Portrait of the Artist Engraving (1783) by Richard Morton Paye
- William Beckford (1782) by George Romney (purchased by 1st Viscount Bearstead in the mistaken belief it was Beckford's father)
- Bacino di San Marco, Venice (c. 1725–26) by Canaletto
- Morning and Night, two of the Four Times of the Day (c. 1736), by William Hogarth
- Massacre of the Innocents (c.1565) attributed to Pieter Brueghel the Younger (a copy of the original by Pieter Bruegel the Elder in the Royal Collection): in 2014 an appeal was launched to raise funds to help conserve the painting.
- The Labourers (1779), The Haymakers (1783) and The Reapers (1783) by George Stubbs
- The Interior of the Church of St. Catherine, Utrecht (1655–1660) by Pieter Jansz. Saenredam
- The Duet or "Le corset blue" (mid-1660s) by Gabriël Metsu
- The Disrobing of Christ (El Espolio) by El Greco (c. 1579) (purchased by Viscount Bearstead in July 1938 for the sum of £5,000)
- Martin Ruzé (1612) by Frans Pourbus the Younger
- The Death of the Virgin (1564) by Pieter Bruegel the Elder, considered one of the finest of his works in grisaille.
- Adoration of the Kings (c. 1495), a triptych by a follower of Hieronymous Bosch (version of the original held by Museo del Prado in Madrid)

== Interior ==
=== Dining Room ===
This room was chosen by Lord Bearsted as a place to display pictures with a sporting theme, consistent with the use of the estate for sporting pursuits. The room also contains a set of dining chairs embroidered by Marcus Samuel, 3rd Viscount Bearsted, as a means of rehabilitation to recover from injuries received during the Second World War.

=== Long Gallery ===
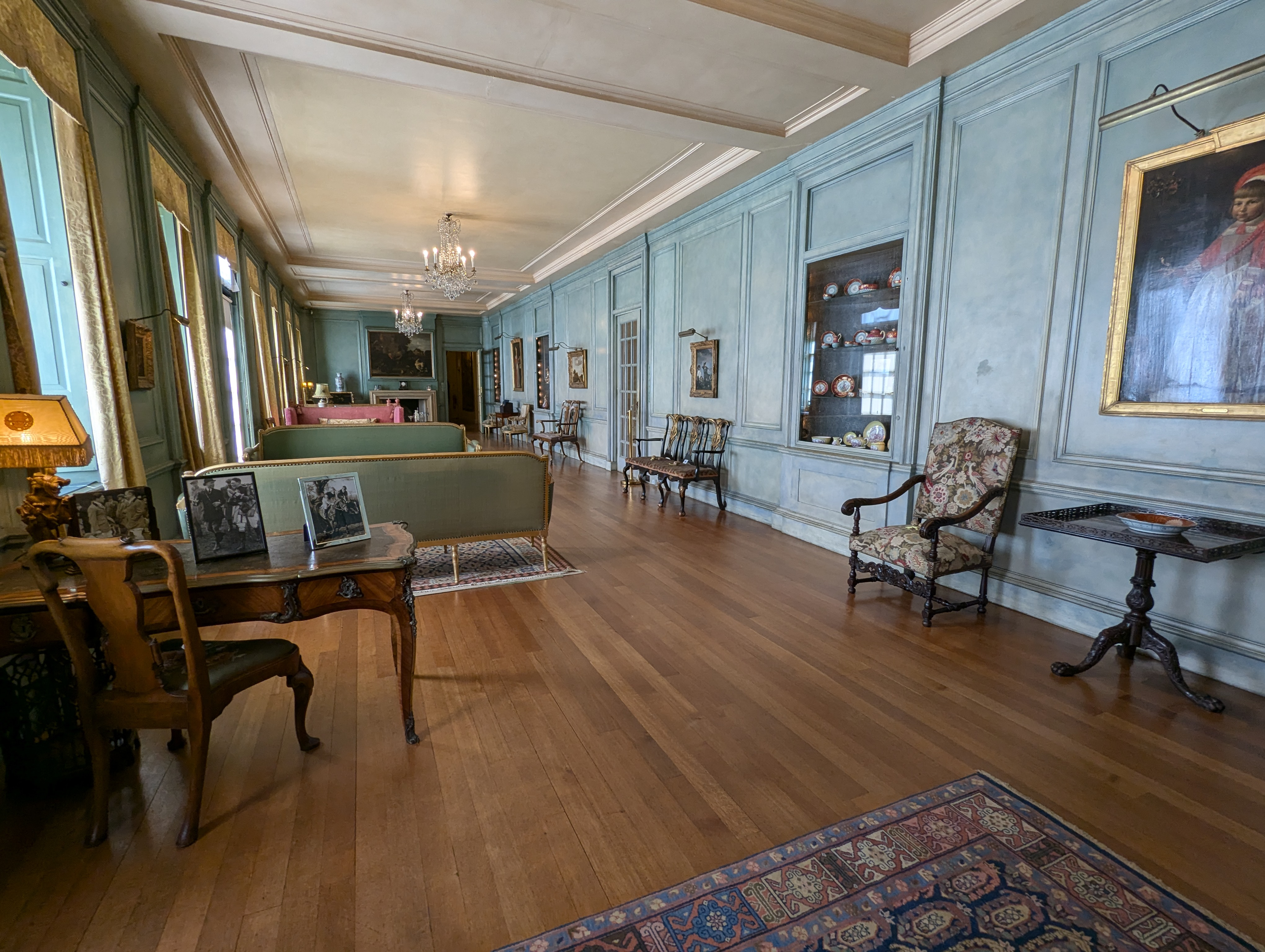
The Long Gallery

The present long, narrow room was created by combining three smaller rooms during the renovations of the 1920s. The art in this room includes an array of Dutch Masters. A series of display cases designed by Percy Richard Morley Horder also showcase a range of English porcelain from Chelsea, Derby and Bow as well as the French factories in Vincennes as Sèvres, predominately featuring Rococo figures and decorative objects.

=== Porcelain Lobby ===
The highlights of porcelain collection are displayed here, focusing on masterpieces of 18C French ceramics. The works originate from both the Vincennes and the Sèvres factories and include:

- A coffee cup and saucer decorated with images of Benjamin Franklin, dating from his time as French ambassador
- Table service commissioned by Catherine the Great
- A plate ordered by Madame du Barry

=== Picture Gallery Passage ===
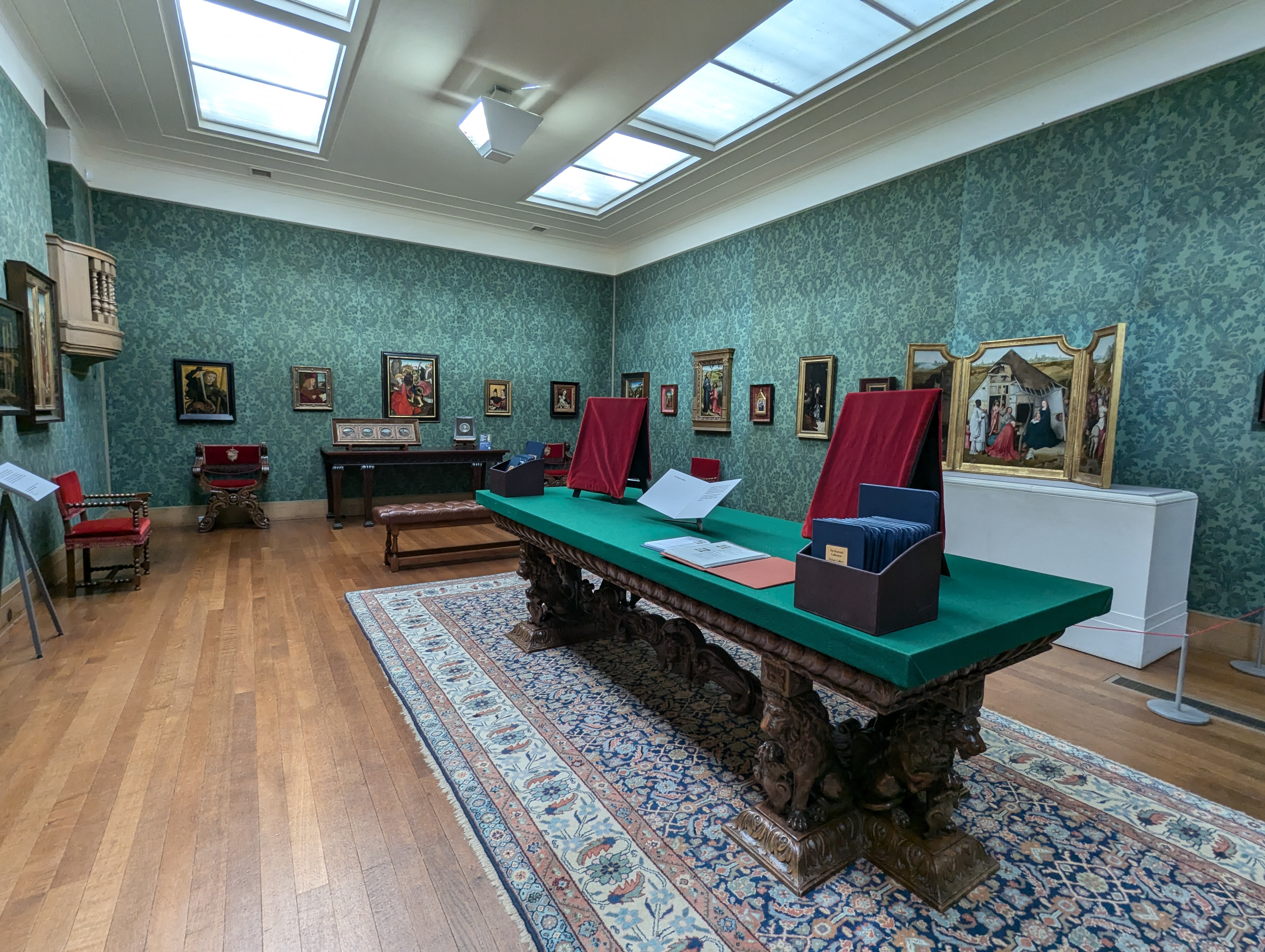
The Picture Gallery

The Picture Gallery Passage is a narrow hallway leading to the Picture Gallery, in which hangs a number of masterpieces from the collection.

=== Picture Gallery ===
Following the renovations of the 1920s, this room was used as a squash court, and a gallery from that time remains visible. The room was then converted by architect Ernest Joseph into a gallery space in 1936, and serves as the display space for the 15th and 16th-century paintings of the collection.

== Sources ==
- Ferguson, Patricia (2015). "Chelsea porcelain groups and. figures, including Apollo and the Muses, from the collection of Marcus Samuel, 1st Viscount Bearsted". Transactions - English Ceramic Circle. 26: 49–68. OCLC 2260764.
- Powers, Alan (2009). Upton House and Gardens: Warwickshire. National Trust. ISBN 9781843592846. OCLC 663431290.
- Smith, Jeffrey Chipps (2019). "Review of Bruegel: The Master; Bruegel: The Hand of the Master". Renaissance Quarterly. 72 (4): 1416–1421. ISSN 0034-4338. JSTOR 26897305.
- Stammers, Thomas (2022). "Country Codes". Apollo: The International Art Magazine. 195 (706): 56-63. ISSN 0003-6536.
