= Michael Samuel (philanthropist) =

British businessman (born 1952)

The Hon Michael John Samuel
- Born: November 2, 1952 (age 72); United Kingdom
- Occupation(s): Businessman, philanthropist
- Known for: Co-founded the fact checking organisation Full Fact
- Spouse: Julia Aline Guinness (m. 1980)
- Children: 4
- Parent(s): Peter Samuel, 4th Viscount Bearsted and Elizabeth Adelaide Cohen

The Hon Michael John Samuel (born 2 November 1952) is a British businessman and philanthropist who co-founded the fact checking organisation Full Fact.

== Early life ==
Samuel is a younger son of Peter Samuel, 4th Viscount Bearsted (1911–1996), an executive of Shell, and his wife Elizabeth Adelaide Cohen, a daughter of Lionel Cohen, Baron Cohen, a barrister and judge. He was educated at Eton. His brother Nicholas is the current Viscount Bearsted.

== Career ==
As a businessman, Samuel was Chief Executive of the Mayborn Group and was Chair of AGL communications agency. He is also Chair of Muddy Puddles and Murex Energy. Samuel was awarded an MBE in 2019 "for services to Young People and Mental Health". He has also been a trustee and director of the Anna Freud Centre for over 20 years, a charity that supports the emotional wellbeing of children.

Samuel co-founded the charity Full Fact in 2010. He also co-founded Civic, "a not-for-profit which aims to support a major change in the approach of communities and organisations". According to The Scotsman, "he made a fortune when he sold the Mayborn Group in a deal worth over £100 million" and is also a non-executive director of Poison Diaries Ltd, which publishes novels by the Duchess of Northumberland. His children are said to be friends of Prince William, while his wife Julia Samuel is part of the Guinness dynasty and was close friends with Princess Diana.

In 2013, Samuel was fined £400 for speeding. Between 2009 and 2019 he has donated £160,000 to the Conservative Party, according to Electoral Commission records.

== Personal life ==
On 6 March 1980, Samuel married Julia Aline Guinness, the youngest daughter of James Edward Alexander Rundell Guinness, and in 1999 they were living in Hyde Park Gate. They have three daughters and a son.
