= Frederick Godber, 1st Baron Godber =

The Lord Godber of Mayfield
- Born: 6 November 1888
- Died: 10 April 1976 (aged 87)
- Burial place: St Dunstan's Church, Mayfield
- Spouse: Violet Ethel Beatrice Lovesay (m. 1914)

Frederick Godber, 1st Baron Godber of Mayfield (6 November 1888 – 10 April 1976) was a British petroleum executive.

== Early life ==
Godber was the third son, and youngest of five children, of carpenter Edward Godber, of Camberwell, formerly of Derby, and Marion Louise, daughter of George Peach.

== Career ==
Godber was an executive in the petroleum industry, becoming Chairman and Managing Director of Shell. He was with the Asiatic Petroleum Company in 1904, became a director of Shell Union Oil Corporation in 1922, a director of Shell Transport and Trading Company in 1928, and appointed managing director in 1934. He was chairman of Shell Union Oil from 1937 to 1946, and of Shell Transport and Trading Company from 1946 to 1961. He also served as chairman of the Rhoxana Corporation from 1922 to 1928, and was chairman of the Commonwealth Development Finance Company from its inception until retiring in 1968. He was knighted 7 July 1942. He was raised to the peerage as Baron Godber, of Mayfield in the County of Sussex, in 1956. He had already been made a Grand Officer of the Order of Orange-Nassau in 1947.

== Personal life ==
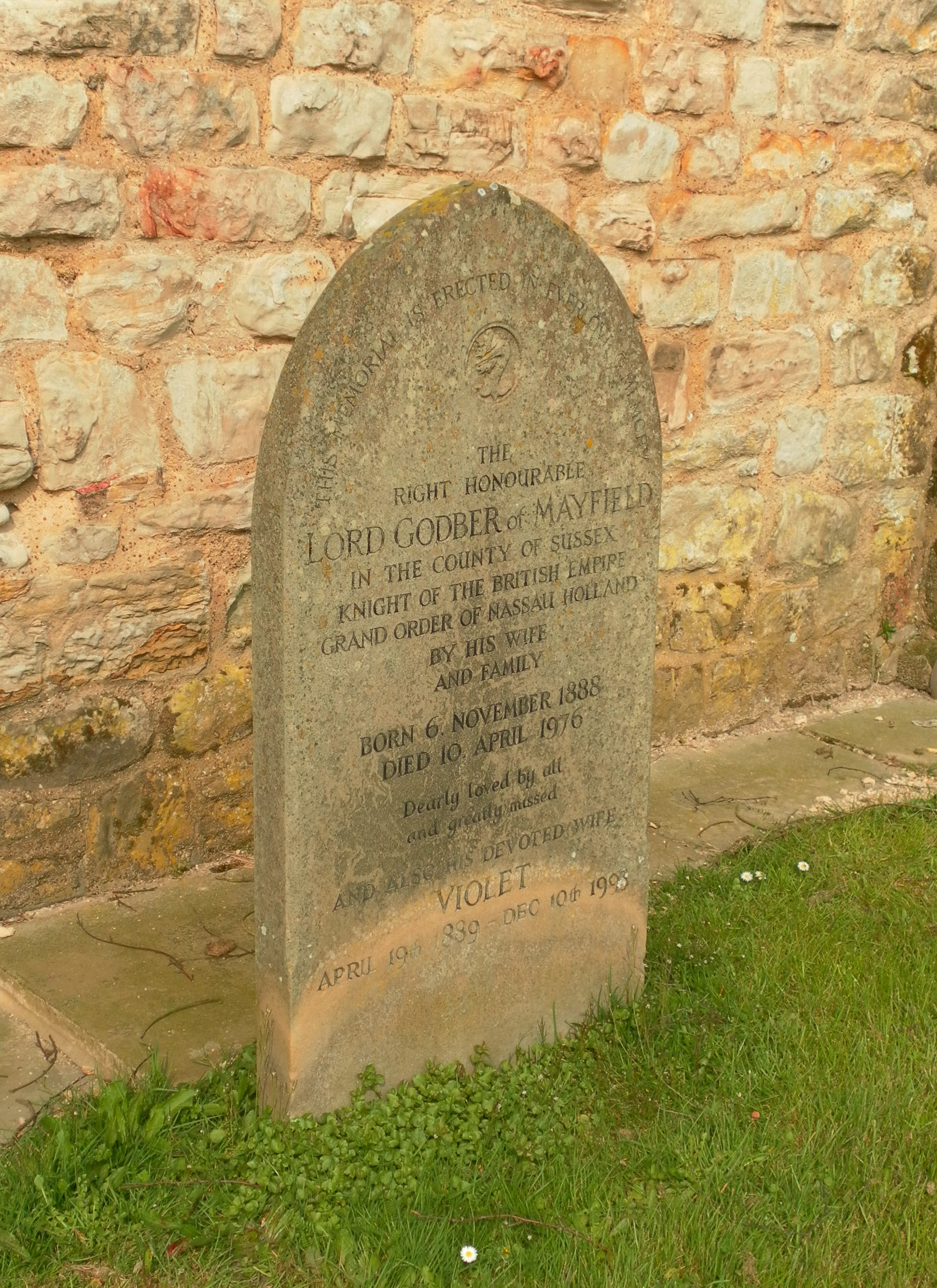
Lord Godber's grave at St Dunstan's Church, Mayfield

In 1914, he married Violet Ethel Beatrice, daughter of George Lovesy, of Cheltenham, Gloucestershire: they had two daughters: Joyce Violet (1917-), who married in 1937 Andrew Agnew, of Sweethaw's Farm, Crowborough, Sussex, son of Sir Andrew Agnew, CBE, of Glenlee Park, New Galloway, Kirkcudbrightshire, Scotland, and had three daughters; and Daphne Joan (1923-2020), who married in 1942 Squadron Leader (Archibald) Ian Scott Debenham, of Pollards Hill, Limpsfield, Surrey, RAFVR, DFC, son of Archibald Scott Debenham, of Lightoaks, Ingatestone, Essex, and had four children. Lord Godber died in April 1976, aged 87, when the barony became extinct. He was buried at St Dunstan Churchyard, Mayfield, Sussex.

Business positions
Preceded by Walter Horace Samuel	Chairman of Shell Transport and Trading; 1946–1961	Succeeded by Frederick Stephens
Peerage of the United Kingdom
New creation	Baron Godber; 1956–1976	Extinct
