= Nellie Ionides =

English collector, connoisseur and philanthropist (1883–1962)

The Honorable Nellie Ionides
- Born: Nellie Samuel; 2 July 1883
- Died: 15 November 1962 (aged 79)
- Burial place: Golders Green Jewish Cemetery, London
- Other names: Nellie Levy
- Occupations: Collector, connoisseur and philanthropist
- Era: Twentieth century
- Known for: Her expertise in Oriental Porcelain; also for saving the 18th-century Octagon Room at Orleans House in Twickenham from destruction, and donating this and also many pieces from her art collection to what is now the London Borough of Richmond upon Thames
- Spouse(s): Major Walter Henry Levy (died 1923); Basil Ionides (died 1950)
- Father: Marcus Samuel, 1st Viscount Bearsted
- Relatives: Samuel Samuel (uncle); Robert Henriques (son-in-law)
- Family: Toby Jessel (grandson)

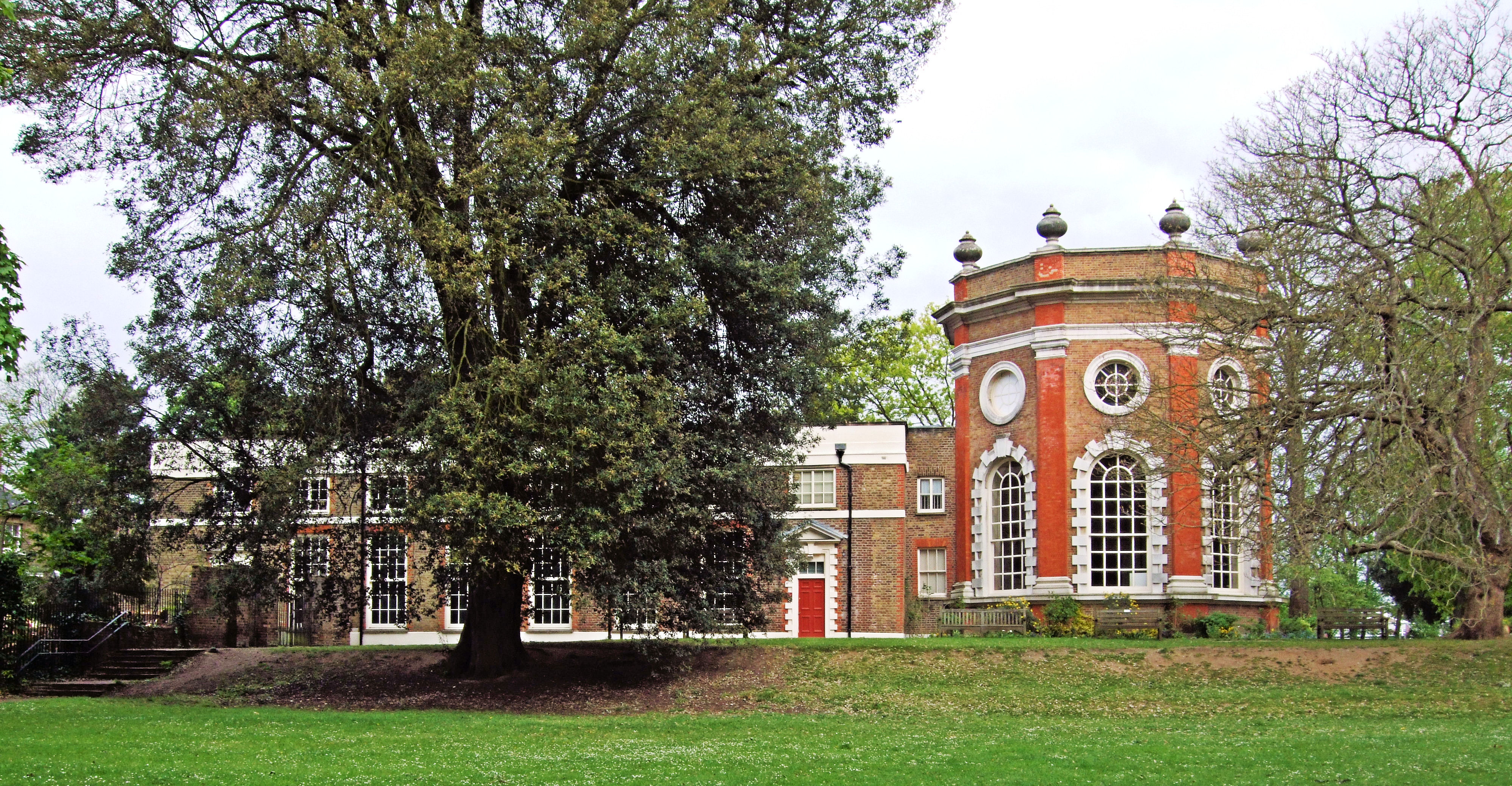
Octagon Room and service wing of Orleans House, Twickenham, now the Octagon House Gallery

The Honorable (Note: As she was the daughter of a peer she was entitled to use the honorific "The Honorable" from 1921. Her father, Sir Marcus Samuel, was created 1st Baron Bearsted of Maidstone in the 1921 Birthday Honours; in the 1925 Birthday Honours, he was elevated to a viscountcy as 1st Viscount Bearsted. "No. 33053". The London Gazette (Supplement). 2 June 1925. p. 3767.) Nellie Ionides (born Nellie Samuel; 1883 – 15 November 1962) was an English collector, connoisseur and philanthropist. She is best known for saving the 18th-century Octagon Room at Orleans House in Twickenham from destruction, and for donating this and also many pieces from her extensive art collection to the local council (now the London Borough of Richmond upon Thames).

== Life ==
Born on 2 July 1883, she was the second child and the elder daughter of Sir Marcus Samuel and his wife Fanny (née Benjamin). She had two brothers – Walter Horace (born on 13 March 1882) and Gerald George (born on 6 May 1888) – and a sister, Ida Marie (born on 22 April 1890). Her father, Marcus, became Lord Mayor of London and founded the Shell Transport and Trading Company, which later became Royal Dutch Shell. When both her parents died in February 1927, she inherited a large fortune.

She married twice. Her first husband was Major Walter Henry Levy, son of Henry Arthur Levy and Annette Beddington. They married on 7 April 1903 and Nellie, who was 19, had seven bridesmaids. Her father was Lord Mayor of London at the time and it was the first Jewish wedding to be held at the Mansion House, London, the Lord Mayor's official residence. Nellie and Walter set up house in Lowndes Square, near the north end of Sloane Square and Nellie kept horses in a mews behind, riding in Hyde Park. Nellie and Walter (who died in 1923) had four children together: Mary Violet Levy (born on 7 February 1904); Winifred May Levy (born on 12 December 1905), who married Richard Frederick Jessel in 1926 – their son Toby Jessel was the Member of Parliament for Twickenham from 1970 to 1997; Vivian Doris Levy (born on 29 July 1907), who married the writer and broadcaster Robert Henriques; and John Henry Levy, known as Jack, who was born on 9 June 1910.

In 1930 she met the architect Basil Ionides while he was decorating her residence at 49 Berkeley Square West. They married later that year.

In 1931 the Ionides bought Buxted Park in Buxted, Sussex. A fire in the 1940s destroyed the top floor, which they never replaced: however, they restored and refurbished the rest of the building. When Nellie died and Buxted House was sold, it was bought by Kenneth Shipman who owned Twickenham Film Studios. It is now a Grade II* listed luxury hotel.

The Ionides lived at Buxted House and also at Riverside House in Twickenham, which Nellie had purchased in 1927. In 1926, a firm of gravel merchants bought the house next door – Orleans House – and also its surrounding grounds, and then demolished the main house. Nellie Ionides purchased the adjoining 1721 Octagon Room designed by James Gibbs, and the stables buildings, saving them from destruction. The Octagon Room and its service wing are now listed Grade I by Historic England.

The Ionides were important art collectors. Nellie Ionides was an expert in Oriental porcelain and collected artworks. She was also a dog lover and started England's largest standard poodle kennel, at Buxted Park. Called Vulcan Kennels, it housed over 100 dogs and was also a school for kennel maids.

== Death and legacy ==
Nellie Ionides died on 15 November 1962 and is buried at Golders Green Jewish Cemetery, as is her first husband, Walter Henry Levy. On her death, the Municipal Borough of Twickenham – which was absorbed three years later into the London Borough of Richmond upon Thames – was bequeathed the Octagon Room, its surrounding buildings (now the Orleans House Gallery) and the grounds of Orleans House, together with Nellie Ionides' art collection of local topographical views.

The National Portrait Gallery has a photographic portrait of her, taken in 1934 by Bassano Studios.

== See also ==
- Basil Ionides
- Orleans House
