= Derian =

Derian is a given name and surname. Notable people with the name include:

- Derian Hatcher (born 1972), American ice hockey player
- John Derian (fl. 1992), American artist, designer, and antiques dealer
- Patricia Derian (1929–2016), American civil rights and human rights activist
