= Basil Ionides =

British architect

Basil Ionides (20 June 1884 – 23 September 1950) was a British architect who published two best-selling books, Colour and Interior Decoration (1926) and Colour in Everyday Rooms (1934). He is best known for his 1929 interior design of the rebuilt Savoy Theatre in London.

== Biography ==
Ionides was born in Scotland, the fourth son of Luke Ionides and grandson of Alexander Constantine Ionides, art patron and collector. The Ionides were one a wealthy trading families originally from Chios, part of the wider Anglo-Greek community. He studied at Tonbridge School and Glasgow School of Art 1900–1903. While there, he wrote architecture articles. He served his apprenticeship with Alexander Nisbet Paterson, during which he designed his first building, the double villa in Winton Drive, when he was only 18. Upon the completion of his apprenticeship in 1904 or 1905, he moved to London and joined the office first of Leonard Stokes and then of Harold Ainsworth Peto.

Ionides entered independent practice in 1908 and designed a number of English houses. During the First World War, he served in the Naval Reserve and was commissioned. He relinquished the commission, however, preferring to serve as an ordinary seaman, as he did not like giving orders to more experienced men. He was injured in 1917 and returned to private practice, particularly performing interior work.

Ionides married the Honourable Nellie Samuel, the widow of Walter Henry Levy, daughter of the 1st Viscount Bearsted, in 1930 after meeting her while he was decorating her residence in Berkeley Square. She was an expert in Oriental porcelain and collected art works, many of which were donated to the Municipal Borough of Twickenham, later to become the London Borough of Richmond upon Thames. The Ionides acquired Buxted Park in Buxted, Sussex in 1931. With a combination of Basil's discerning eye and Nellie's fortune as the Shell Oil heiress, they restored the Park and became important art collectors. But fire destroyed much of the house in 1940, and the top storey was lost entirely, with much of their collection. Ionides scavenged architectural pieces from bombed-out buildings around the country with which to rebuild his stately home (now the Buxted Park Hotel). He served as High Sheriff of Sussex for 1944.

Ionides was an important Art Deco designer. He was best known as the architect (with Frank A. Tugwell) for the rebuilding of the Savoy Theatre in London in 1929 and for Claridge's Restaurant. For the Savoy Hotel's restaurant, he famously sculpted Kaspar, the Black Cat, who acts as a good-luck guest at tables if thirteen would otherwise be present. He published the important books Colour and Interior Decoration in 1926 and Colour in Everyday Rooms in 1934. He also designed the interior of the ticket hall at Hounslow West tube station. Ionides was admitted to the Royal Institute of British Architects (RIBA) in 1931 and was elevated to Fellow in 1938.

Ionides died in Brighton at the age of 66 and is buried in St Margaret's Church in Buxted Park.
