= Through the Valley =

Through the Valley may refer to:

- Through the Valley (novel), a 1950 novel
- Through the Valley (The Last of Us), episode of the television series The Last of Us
- Through the Valley (song), 2012 song used in the video game The Last of Us Part II
