= Sabrina Guinness =

British and Irish television producer (born 1955)

- Born: 9 January 1955 (age 70)
- Occupation: Television producer
- Title: Lady Stoppard
- Spouse: Tom Stoppard (m. 2014; died 2025)
- Relatives: Julia Samuel (sister); Hugo Guinness (brother)
- Family: Guinness

Sabrina Jane Guinness, Lady Stoppard (born 9 January 1955) is a British and Irish television producer.

== Background ==
Sabrina Guinness is the eldest child (of four daughters and a son) of James Edward Alexander Rundell Guinness CBE (1924–2006), of Coldpiece Farm, Hound Green, near Basingstoke, Hampshire, a Second World War veteran of the Royal Navy, and a banker with Guinness Mahon, the Guinness Peat Group, and Provident Mutual Life Assurance, also Chairman of the Public Works Loan Board 1970–90, and Pauline Vivien (1926–2017), daughter of Lieutenant-Colonel Howard Vivien Mander, MC, of Congreve Manor, Penkridge, Staffordshire, a director of his family's business, Mander Brothers. Guinness is a member of the "banking line" of the Guinness family, founders of Guinness Mahon in 1836, which descends from Samuel Guinness (1727–1795), the brother of Arthur Guinness.

Guinness has a twin sister, journalist Miranda; her other siblings are the artist and writer Hugo Guinness; Anita Guinness, wife of the late Hon. Amschel Rothschild; and philanthropist Julia Samuel, a psychotherapist and paediatric counsellor and co-founder of Child Bereavement UK, who married the Hon. Michael Samuel, of the Hill Samuel banking family, and son of Peter Samuel, 4th Viscount Bearsted, Deputy Chairman of Shell Transport and Trading.

== Career ==
Sabrina Guinness founded the London-based charity Youth Cable Television (YCTV), which she established in 1995 with the help of Greg Dyke. The charity trains disadvantaged youth to work in television production. She previously worked as PA for David Stirling, the founder of the Special Air Service (SAS).

== Personal life ==
Guinness was once dubbed "the It Girl of her generation" for her high-profile romantic liaisons. In 1979, she had a relationship with the then Prince Charles.

In 2014 she married playwright Tom Stoppard. They lived in Blandford, Dorset; she also has a home in Notting Hill, west London.
