= Robert Henriques =

British writer (1905–1967)

Robert David Quixano Henriques (11 December 1905 – 22 January 1967) was a British writer, broadcaster and farmer. He gained modest renown for two award-winning novels and two biographies of Jewish business tycoons, published during the middle part of the 20th century.

== Life and career ==
Robert Henriques was born in 1905 to one of the oldest Sephardic Portuguese families that migrated to Britain in the 17th century. He was educated at Lockers Park School, Rugby, and New College, Oxford. He joined the Royal Artillery in 1926, and served as a gunnery officer in Egypt and the Sudan. A riding accident put him in the hospital and caused him to take retirement in 1933.

Around 1936, Henriques ran a printing business, V.W.H. Printers Ltd, that had an office in 207 Goswell Road, Central London, which printed a number of provincial weeklies in Faringdon (then in Berkshire). V.W.H. Printers Ltd was the first firm to print the fortnightly Spain and the World, the first issue of which was published in December 1936, which Henriques pasted up.

His book No Arms, No Armour (1939) came out to considerable critical praise. Much of the novel was autobiographical.

When World War II broke out, Henriques was an officer in the Territorial Army. He was immediately called up, and he served with distinction through the war, first in the Royal Artillery, then with the newly formed Commandos, and finally at the headquarters of Combined Operations. During the course of the war, Henriques rose to the rank of Colonel. He received both American and British awards. He was awarded the American Bronze and Silver Stars for his bravery in North Africa and Sicily when he was attached to US Forces under Patton (see 'Robert Henriques - My Biography' Secker and Warburg 1969). And he was awarded the British MBE.

After the war, Henriques began a new life as a farmer in the Cotswolds. Starting from rather modest beginnings, his farm near Cirencester became a large and impressive operation. Henriques had outstanding success as a cattle-breeder and won competitions. He lived the life of a country squire, carrying on hunting, fishing and shooting, and even writing occasional letters to the Times on farming issues.

Writing remained his first love, however, and in 1950 he became a recipient of the annual James Tait Black Award for his novel Through the Valley. He was also a frequent broadcaster and appeared on Any Questions and on various television shows. He also helped to run the Cheltenham Literary Festival with John Moore, although things always did not go his own way. Although he had accomplished much in all his various fields of endeavour – soldiering, farming, writing and broadcasting – Henriques was described as a restless character, who remained dissatisfied with himself and who was difficult to please.

The following year, he wrote 100 Hours to Suez, and it was around this time, in his late forties, that Henriques began to take an active interest and pride in his Jewish identity. He was won over by the Zionist cause, and made frequent trips to Israel where he bought a small property.

In the 1960s, Henriques wrote two biographies. The first one charted the life and career of his wife's grandfather Marcus Samuel, the great oil pioneer and leader of the Jewish community, and the second one described the life of Sir Robert Waley Cohen.

In 1928 he married Vivien Doris Levy, daughter of Nellie Levy and granddaughter of the 1st Viscount Bearsted. The couple had two sons and two daughters. The younger son Michael Henriques (born 1941) is the father of Katrina Henriques, wife since 1991 of the Hon. David Seymour Hicks Beach (born 1955), heir presumptive to his brother the 3rd Earl Saint Aldwyn.

== See also ==
- Henriques family
