= Walter Samuel, 2nd Viscount Bearsted =

Anglo-Jewish army officer and oilman (1882–1948)

Colonel The Viscount Bearsted MC
- Bearsted in 1942
- Born: 13 March 1882; London, England
- Died: 8 November 1948 (aged 66); Upton House, Warwickshire
- Burial place: Willesden Jewish Cemetery
- Education: Eton College; New College, Oxford
- Spouse: Dorothy Montefiore Micholls (m. 1908)
- Military career
- Allegiance: United Kingdom
- Branch: British Army
- Service years: 1914–1948
- Rank: Colonel
- Unit: Queen's Own West Kent Yeomanry
- Conflicts: World War I World War II

Colonel Walter Horace Samuel, 2nd Viscount Bearsted, MC (13 March 1882 – 8 November 1948) was an Anglo-Jewish army officer and oilman. Samuel was the son of Marcus Samuel, the founder of Shell Transport and Trading, and from 1921 to 1946 served as the company's second chairman. He was also a prominent art collector, storing many of his pieces at his family home at Upton House in Warwickshire, and a philanthropist. He was a member of the anti-Zionist Jewish Fellowship, which was founded in 1942.

== Education and Army career ==
Samuel was the son of Marcus Samuel, 1st Viscount Bearsted and his wife Fanny Elizabeth Samuel. He was born in London, UK and was educated at Eton College before going up to New College, Oxford. Samuel initially pursued a career in the British Army, serving in the Queen's Own West Kent Yeomanry and eventually reaching the rank of captain. It was during his Army career that he served in the First World War between 1914 and 1918, gaining the Military Cross (MC) and being mentioned in dispatches twice.

Lord Bearsted also served in the Second World War, gaining the rank of colonel with the Intelligence Corps. This was actually a cover for his work with the Secret Intelligence Service (SIS aka MI6) and then Special Operations Executive (SOE). As an officer of Section D, SIS from 1939, he was involved first in early attempts to create resistance networks in Scandinavia and was then a key figure in the plans to found a British resistance organisation – the Home Defence Scheme. In the summer of 1940, he supervised the transfer of part of the SIS intelligence operation to the new Auxiliary Units.

== Business interests ==
Samuel became a director of the Shell Transport and Trading Company, which his father and uncle had founded in 1897; in 1921 upon his father's retirement, he succeeded as chairman. Samuel himself became the 2nd Viscount Bearsted, along with a Barony and Baronetcy, upon his father's death in 1927. He spoke only on the topics of petroleum and Jewish affairs when sitting in the House of Lords.

== Art collecting and philanthropy ==
Samuel's father had donated money to the Maidstone Museum in which his son's Japanese collection, inspired by the family's oriental business activities, was displayed. Lord Bearsted continued to collect art after inheriting his father's titles and transformed Upton House in Warwickshire into a haven for his beautiful and ever-increasing collection. Among his artwork features pieces by Rembrandt, Canaletto, George Stubbs, Hans Holbein the Younger and Hogarth. His house and collection were donated to the National Trust in 1948 in order to preserve it for the British public to enjoy.

Lord Bearsted was chairman of the trustees of the National Gallery, as recorded in 1936, and a trustee of the Tate Gallery, as recorded in 1938. In addition, he made many donations to the Ashmolean Museum in Oxford and served as chairman of the Whitechapel Art Gallery in London in the years preceding his death.

Coming from a Jewish family, Samuel supported many Jewish charities including financing the Bearsted Memorial Hospital in Stoke Newington and the Bearsted maternity home at Hampton Court. He also campaigned for the emigration of Jews from Nazi Germany during the 1930s and, at the London Conference of 1939, against closing Palestine to Jewish immigration.

== Personal life ==
Samuel married Dorothy Montefiore Micholls on 23 July 1908 at West End Synagogue in London. His wife became Viscountess Bearsted, or Lady Bearsted socially, when her husband inherited his father's titles in 1927. Lady Bearsted died on 19 December 1949. The couple had four children:

- Marcus Richard Samuel (1 June 1909 – 15 October 1986)
- Peter Montefiore Samuel (9 December 1911 – 9 June 1996)
- Daphne Isobel Samuel (21 April 1913 – 14 February 1914)
- Anthony Gerald Samuel (18 February 1917 – 3 January 2001)

Peerage of the United Kingdom
Preceded by Marcus Samuel	Viscount Bearsted; 1927 – 1948	Succeeded by Marcus Richard Samuel
Business positions
Preceded by Marcus Samuel	Chairman of Shell Transport and Trading; 1921–1946	Succeeded by Frederick Godber as Chairman of Shell Transport and Trading
Preceded by Marcus Samuel	Chairman of Shell Transport and Trading; 1921–1946	Succeeded by Guus Kessler as senior position in Royal Dutch Shell (from 1946 Chairman of the Committee of Managing Directors created)
