= Full Fact =

British fact-checking organisation

- Founded: 2009
- Founders: Michael Samuel and Will Moy
- Type: Charity
- Registration no.: 1158683
- Location: London
- Coordinates: 51.505194°N 0.136471°W
- Website: fullfact.org

Full Fact is a British charity based in London which checks and corrects facts reported in the news as well as claims which circulate on social media.

== History and structure ==
Full Fact was founded in 2009 by businessman Michael Samuel, the charity's chair, and Will Moy, who served as director. As of 2026, it had more than 40 staff based around the United Kingdom. Moy had been working as a researcher for Lord Low and noticed that lobbyists often provided inaccurate briefings to legislators, while Samuel had been concerned about accuracy in public debate for some years.

Full Fact applied to the Charity Commission for charitable status in 2009 but was refused. An appeal to the commission's tribunal in 2011 was rejected on the grounds that the stated objective of "civic engagement" was too political. Charitable status was granted in 2014 after the wording was changed to "the advancement of public education".

In March 2017, the International Fact Checking Network certified Full Fact as a fact-checker.

Moy resigned in April 2023, citing need for change at the top of the organisation, joining the Campbell Collaboration as CEO with his work focusing on producing systematic reviews. Chris Morris was announced as the new chief executive in September 2023 and joined the following month.

== Methodology ==
Full Fact initially rated material on a five-point scale, using a magnifying glass as a symbol instead of a star. It dropped this system as it felt such ratings were unreliable and did not help its reputation.

The fact-checking process includes a three-stage review and facts also may be reviewed by external academics.

Full Fact has been sponsored to develop automated fact-checking tools by the Omidyar Network and Open Society Foundations. Live is one such tool which will immediately check statements against a database of verified facts. The other tool, called Trends, will track and display the spread of false information.

Full Fact offers three-month secondments to statisticians working in the Government Statistical Service. Secondees have performed activities such as fact-checking Question Time and providing guidance on presenting statistics. Full Fact has also partnered with media organisations including the BBC, ITV, and Sky News to provide information about political campaigns including the Scottish and 2016 Brexit referendum referendums and the general elections of 2015 and 2017. It also provided evidence to the Leveson Inquiry and the BBC Trust's impartiality review.

=== Framework for information incidents ===
Full fact created a framework for so-called information incidents which is used by the Counter-Disinformation Policy Forum to assess information incidents. The creation of this framework was supported by a grant by Facebook. It deals with three classifications of data that should be responded to: misinformation, disinformation, and malinformation. The framework was produced with consultation with the Department for Culture, Media and Sport, International Fact-Checking Network, Google, Facebook and Twitter amongst others. The framework defines five levels of incident.

== Focus ==
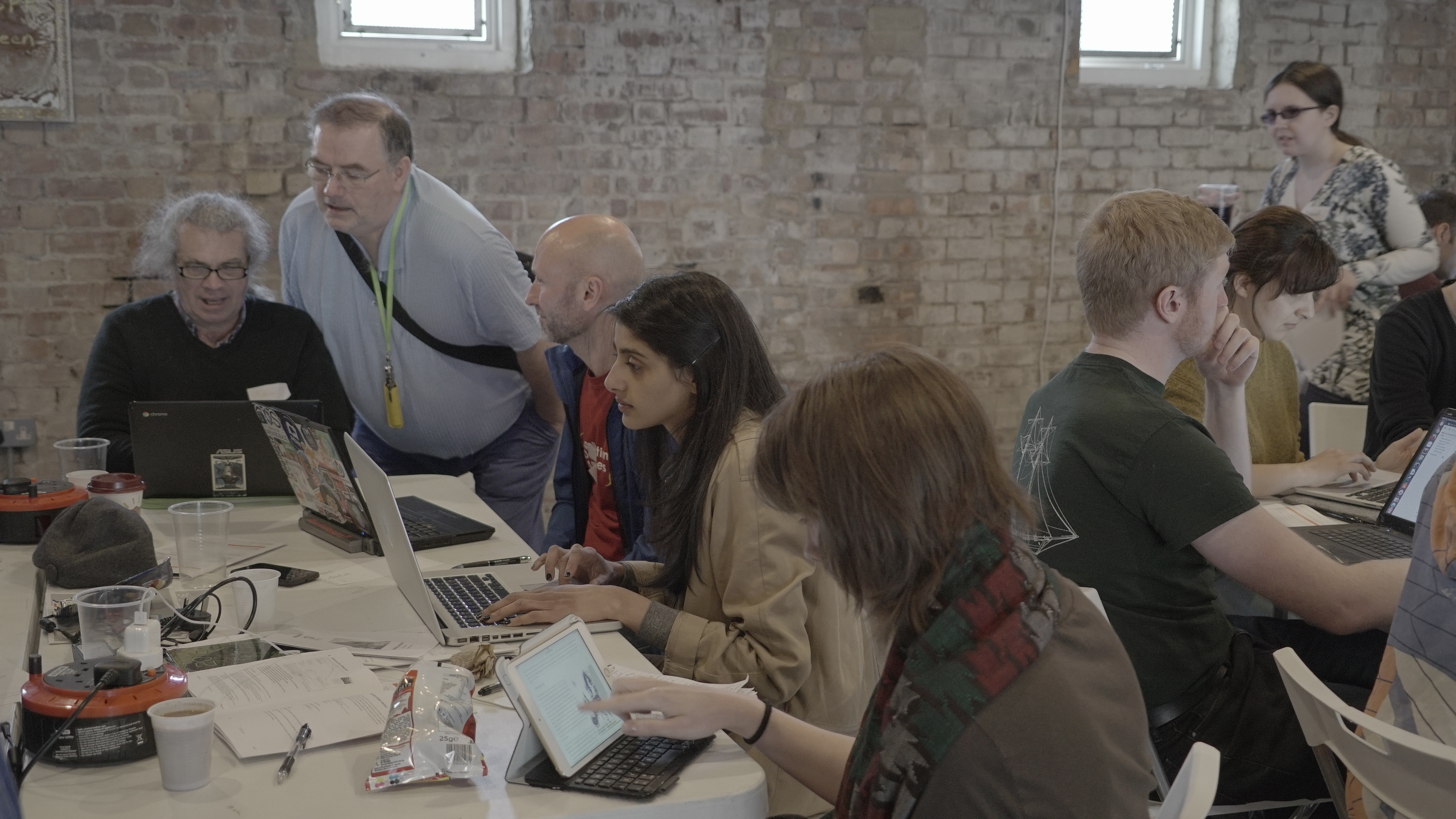
Fact-checking the UK's EU referendum

In 2016, Full Fact checked claims made during the United Kingdom European Union membership referendum campaign. In 2017, Full Fact worked with a similar organisation named First Draft to carry out fact-checking during the UK general election.

On 11 January 2019, it was announced that Full Fact would be providing fact-checking services to the Facebook platform.

In January 2022, Full Fact signed a letter of fact checkers calling for YouTube to stop algorithms from suggesting videos of creators deemed to be spreading misinformation or disinformation as well as to display contextual information on videos deemed to be spreading such information.

In evidence submitted regarding the Online Safety Bill, Full Fact argued for widening the definition of harmful content to be suppressed to include content that is harmful to democracy and society, not just individuals. They argued that suppressed content should specified by legislation for increased democratic oversight, arguing that there was de facto censorship-by-proxy by the government through officials contacting companies.

In January 2023, Full Fact called for the removal of Conservative MP Andrew Bridgen from the party after he made claims that COVID-19 vaccines were a gene therapy with various medical side effects.

== See also ==
- Snopes – Fact-checking website
