= Hugo Guinness =

British artist, illustrator, and writer (born 1959)

- Born: Hugo Arthur Rundell Guinness; 12 September 1959 (age 66); London, England
- Education: Eton College
- Occupations: Artist, illustrator, writer
- Known for: Black-and-white block prints; Work in The New Yorker and The New York Times; Collaborations with Wes Anderson
- Movement: Contemporary art
- Spouse: Elliott Puckette (m. 1996)
- Children: 2
- Relatives: Sabrina Guinness (sister); Julia Samuel (sister)
- Family: Guinness
- Website: hugoguinness.com

Hugo Arthur Rundell Guinness (born 12 September 1959) is a British artist, illustrator, and writer. He is known for his illustrations in The New York Times and his bold, graphic black-and-white block prints, many of which have appeared in films and publications. He is perhaps best known for his collaborations with film director Wes Anderson.

== Early life and education ==
Guinness attended Eton College. Prior to turning to a career as an artist and writer, he served as a copywriter at the advertising agency Collett Dickenson Pearce, an investment banker with Guinness Mahon, and the founder of Coldpiece Pottery.

== Career ==
=== Art and illustration ===
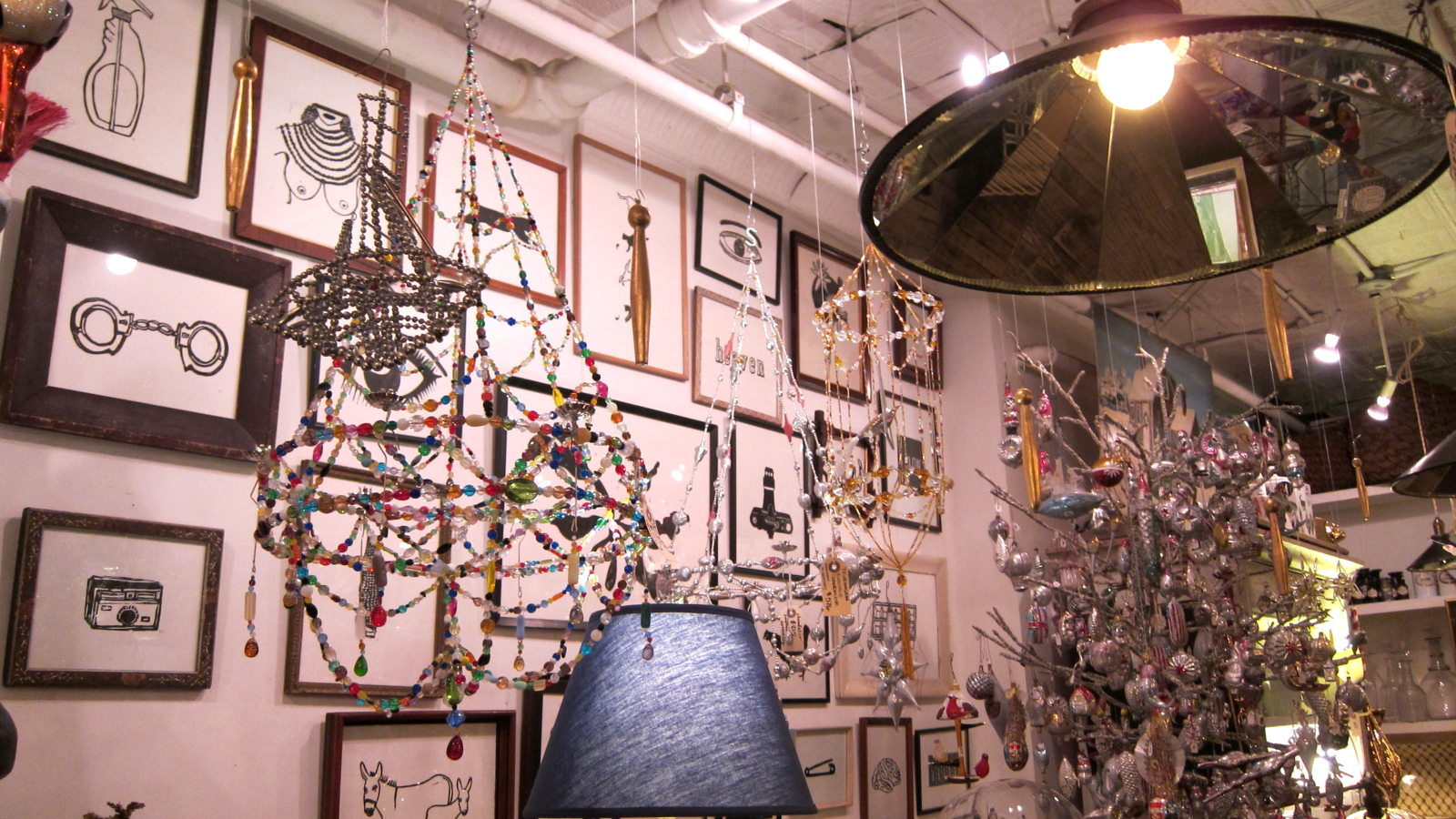
Guinness's linocuts displayed at John Derian Company in 2015

Guinness depicts everyday and eclectic objects and phrases in a simple yet humorous way. His work has been featured in The New Yorker, The New York Times, and Vogue. Guinness has designed apparel for Pussy Glamour and a range of leather goods for Coach New York.

His work has been collected by notable figures including magazine editor Anna Wintour, actor Heath Ledger, actresses Amanda Peet, Natalie Portman, and Michelle Williams, artist Jack Pierson, and director Wes Anderson.

=== Film ===
Guinness has collaborated with Wes Anderson on several films, including providing artwork for The Royal Tenenbaums (2001) and The Life Aquatic with Steve Zissou (2004). He voiced the character Nathan Bunce in Fantastic Mr. Fox (2009) and co-wrote the story for The Grand Budapest Hotel (2014), earning a shared nomination for the Academy Award for Best Original Screenplay.

In 2015, he created an animated short film for J.Crew to raise awareness about ivory poaching.

He also contributed to the BBC Storyville documentary Hi Society – The Wonderful World of Nicky Haslam.

== Personal life ==
Guinness was born in London, the youngest of five children and the only son of Pauline Vivien (née Mander) and James Edward Alexander Rundell Guinness, a banker and Royal Navy veteran. He is a descendant of Samuel Guinness, brother of Arthur Guinness, and a member of the extended Guinness family. His siblings include socialite Sabrina Guinness, Anita Guinness (wife of Amschel Rothschild), and psychotherapist and philanthropist Julia Samuel.

Guinness resides in the Boerum Hill neighborhood of Brooklyn with his wife, the artist Elliott Puckette, whom he married in December 1996. They have two children.
