= Julia Samuel =

Psychotherapist and pediatric counsellor

Julia Samuel MBE
- Born: Julia Aline Guinness; 12 September 1959 (age 66)
- Occupations: Psychotherapist, paediatric counsellor
- Spouse: Hon. Michael Samuel (m. 1980)
- Children: 4
- Relatives: Sabrina Guinness (sister); Hugo Guinness (brother)
- Family: Guinness

Julia Aline Samuel (née Guinness; born 12 September 1959) is a British psychotherapist and paediatric counsellor.

== Early life ==
Samuel is the daughter of James Edward Alexander Rundell Guinness (1924–2006), a banker, and his wife, the former Pauline Vivien Mander (1926–2017). Guinness is a member of the "banking line" of the Guinness family, founders of Guinness Mahon in 1836, which descends from Samuel Guinness (1727–1795), the brother of Arthur Guinness.

Samuel has three older sisters and a younger brother. Her sister Sabrina Guinness is a television producer, her sister Miranda is a journalist, and her sister Anita is the widow of the late Hon. Amschel Rothschild; her brother is artist and writer Hugo Guinness.

== Career ==
After initially working in publishing, Samuel trained as a counsellor.

She is a psychotherapist specialising in grief and worked as a bereavement counsellor in the NHS paediatrics department of St Mary's Hospital, Paddington, where she pioneered the role of maternity and paediatric psychotherapy.

In 1994 she helped launch and establish Child Bereavement UK, and as founder patron, continues to play an active role in the charity.

She has said that a trauma is a psychic wound that has not been processed, and is stored in the fight/flight/freeze part of the brain, the amygdala, and that EMDR is the best evidence-based treatment for trauma.

In 2021 she announced the launch of Grief Works App, a mobile application for iOS and Android to help the bereaved navigate their grief.

In 2022 she launched a podcast, Therapy Works, where she talks to guests about their challenges before reflecting on the session with her daughters.

=== Recognition ===
Samuel was appointed Member of the Order of the British Empire (MBE) in the 2016 New Year Honours for services to bereaved parents of babies. She is a vice president of British Association for Counselling and Psychotherapy and is an Honorary Doctor of Middlesex University.

=== Books ===
Her first book, Grief Works: Stories of Life, Death and Surviving, was published in 2017.

Samuel's second book This Too Shall Pass: Stories of Change, Crisis and Hopeful Beginnings is published on 5 March 2020.

Her third book Every Family Has A Story: How we inherit love and loss was published by Penguin Life on 17 March 2022.

== Personal life ==
On 6 March 1980, at the age of 20, Julia married Michael Samuel, of the Hill Samuel banking family, son of Hon. Peter Samuel, later the 4th Viscount Bearsted.

Samuel is the daughter of Old Etonian James Edward Alexander Rundell Guinness, a partner in - and later chairman of - his family's bank, Guinness Mahon, and chairman of the Public Works Loan Board from 1970 to 1990, and his wife Pauline, daughter of Howard Vivien Mander, of Congreve Manor, Penkridge, Staffordshire. James Guinness descends from the founder of the Guinness Mahon bank, Robert Rundell Guinness, a member of the Anglo-Irish Guinness family. Samuel's brother Hugo Guinness is an artist and model, and her sister is Sabrina Guinness.

She is one of the seven godparents of Prince George.
