= SS Silverlip (1902) =

Steam tanker constructed in 1902

Coordinates: 45°55′N 07°17′W

History

United Kingdom
- Name: Silverlip
- Owner: Sir Marcus Samuel
- Operator: Shell Transport & Trading Co
- Builder: W.G. Armstrong, Whitworth & Co, Walker
- Yard number: 723
- Launched: 29 November 1902
- Sponsored by: Lady Samuel
- Commissioned: 19 March 1903
- Homeport: London
- Identification: UK Official Number 118327; Call sign VGJD
- Fate: Burnt and sank, 1 May 1907

General characteristics
- Type: Tanker
- Tonnage: 7,492 GRT; 4,904 NRT; 10,080 DWT
- Length: 470 ft 0 in (143.26 m)
- Beam: 55 ft 2 in (16.81 m)
- Depth: 33 ft 1 in (10.08 m)
- Installed power: 579 Nhp
- Propulsion: Wallsend Slipway & Engineering Co 3-cylinder triple expansion
- Speed: 11.5 knots (13.2 mph; 21.3 km/h)

Silverlip was a steam tanker built in 1902 by the W.G. Armstrong, Whitworth & Company of Walker for Sir Marcus Samuel owner and chairman of Shell Transport & Trading Company of London. The ship was designed and built to carry liquid cargo and spent her career carrying petroleum products from Borneo and Texas to United Kingdom and Europe.

== Design and construction ==
The vessel was laid down at W.G. Armstrong, Whitworth & Co. shipyard in Walker and launched on 29 November 1902 (yard number 723). The ceremony was attended by a large number of dignitaries, including Lord Mayor of London, Sir Marcus Samuel, Sir Andrew Noble, chairman of W.G. Armstrong, Whitworth & Co., sheriffs of London and Newcastle as well as mayors of local communities, among others. The christening ceremony was performed by Lady Samuel.

The sea trials were held on 19 March, during which the ship could easily maintain speed of 11.5 knots (13.2 mph; 21.3 km/h) under coal with ship loaded. The steamship was designed to the broad specifications of the Shell Transport & Trading Co, allowing the vessel to carry general cargo, such as silk and tea, in addition to oil and petroleum products. This required development of a special cleaning procedure which was successfully accomplished. The ship was equipped with five separate pumps for discharge of liquid cargo, with two of them being able to unload between 200 and 250 tons of liquid per hour. In addition, a complete arrangement of cargo gear for quick handling of general cargo was installed.

As built, the ship was 470 feet 0 inches (143.26 m) long (between perpendiculars) and 55 feet 2 inches (16.81 m) abeam, a mean draft of 33 feet 1 inch (10.08 m). Silverlip was assessed at 7,492 GRT and 4,904 NRT and had deadweight of approximately 10,080. The vessel had a steel hull, and a single 579 nhp triple-expansion steam engine, with cylinders of 29 1/2-inch (75 cm), 48-inch (120 cm) and 78-inch (200 cm) diameter with a 54-inch (140 cm) stroke, that drove a single screw propeller, and moved the ship at up to 11.5 knots (13.2 mph; 21.3 km/h). At the time of construction, the ship's engines were fitted for liquid fuel in addition to coal.

== Operational history ==
At the time of their entry into service, Silverlip was one of the largest vessels in the world. Not surprisingly, following her delivery the ship was laid up due to scarcity of cargo and overabundance of tonnage. Eventually, the ship was reactivated and on 25 February 1904 she proceeded from her mooring on River Tyne to Middlesbrough for loading. Silverlip departed Middlesbrough for her maiden voyage on 10 March, stopped at London and left there on 26 March with general cargo for China and Japan. The vessel passed through the Suez Canal on 10 April and continued her journey calling at ports of Aden, Colombo, Moulmein and arrived at Singapore on 5 May. Silverlip departed two days later arriving at Hong Kong on 13 May and Kobe on 29 May. On her return trip the vessel stopped at Balikpapan and loaded approximately 9,000 tons of benzine from Borneo oilfields and local refinery, continued to Singapore and departed it to Europe on 26 July. The steamer had to sail the long way, around the Cape of Good Hope, due to restrictions with regard to passage of tankers carrying oil and petroleum products in bulk through the Suez Canal, and arrived at Las Palmas on 8 September without calling at any other ports on her trip. On her way Silverlip struck on a rock and sustained damage to bottom and had to replace 8 bottom plates in dock when she arrived at Hamburg on 21 September. After unloading she sailed to United Kingdom, where the ship loaded general cargo and left London on 29 October for her second trip to Far East.

Upon return from her second journey, Silverlip sailed from Rotterdam to Port Arthur on 10 April 1905 and arrived there on 12 May. The vessel loaded 1,457,380 gallons (5,358 tons) of lamp oil and left for England on 22 May, arriving at Liverpool on 22 June consigned to the General Petroleum Company, owned by Sir Marcus Samuel. After unloading her cargo into tanks, the steamer sailed back to Port Arthur on 1 July reaching it on 21 July. There she loaded 3,580,851 gallons of refined kerosene, and 219,678 gallons of desulphurized liquid fuel for delivery to Dover and sailed out on 2 August. The steamer continued carrying petroleum products from Port Arthur and occasionally Borneo, to the United Kingdom and Northern European ports for the remainder of 1905 and through January 1907, when restrictions on oil tankers travelling through the Suez Canal were loosened. On 5 January 1906, while on a passage from Port Arthur to Dover, she had to call at St. Michael's with her steering gear seriously damaged, decks swept and other damages. The steamer also had to jettison about 200 tons of cargo. The repairs were done in St. Michael's harbour and finished on 11 January at a cost of £3,651.

=== Sinking ===
Silverlip departed for her last journey on 11 January 1907 from Cardiff for Balikpapan. She called at Colombo and departed it on 8 February, reaching her destination in early March. There she took in 2,576 tons of benzine into No. 2 and No. 3 holds. The vessel left Balikpapan on 10 March and continued to Singapore, where she loaded 5,841 tons of the same fuel into remaining holds. The ship was almost fully loaded with the exception of the 'tween decks. Silverlip left Singapore on 25 March. She was under command of captain Nathaniel Hocken and had a crew of 53 men. On 30 April 1907, while off Cape Finisterre, she ran into a storm and the temperature dropped down to 45°F with a strong wind from the northwest. On 1 May she was about 240 miles northeast of Cape Finisterre, proceeding at full speed through the Bay of Biscay, when it was discovered that benzine in holds No.3 and No.4 had contracted and the captain ordered the chief engineer to press them with salt water. The screwcap on the No.4 hold expansion tank was taken off, and the gas cocks on the starboard side were also opened to get rid of vapors. The water was pumped down into the No.4 hold on the starboard side for some time and at approximately 13:50 the chief officer retired into his cabin. There were several crew members in the vicinity of No.3 and No.4 holds, among them two firemen on the 'tween deck under the bridge deck abreast of No.3 hold. Shortly after the chief officer left the deck, an explosion occurred in the neighborhood of the No.4 hold and the ship burst into flames amidships. The fire spread quickly with the flames rising into the air 70 to 100 feet. More explosions followed as benzine in the remaining holds ignited. The captain, who was in the aft part of the vessel, rushed through the flames and with assistance of some of the officers and crew managed to get the lifeboats out. The remaining crew in the forward part of the ship had to jump into the water and was picked up in the water by the lifeboats and they pulled away from the blazing wreck. Fortunately, another steamer, SS Westgate, happened to be in the vicinity, and rushed to help after noticing the blaze from about 9 miles away. Westgate picked up 48 survivors and took them to Plymouth. Five people died in the explosion and the resulting fire, including the chief engineer. An investigation conducted after the disaster put blame on one of the crew members, most likely one of the firemen, lightning a match and igniting the vapors emanating from the No.4 hold after it was open.
