= SS Murex =

Shell purpose-built oil tanker

History
- Name: Murex (1892–1916)
- Owner: Marcus Samuel & Company (1892–1898); Shell Transport & Trading Company (1898–1907); Anglo-Saxon Petroleum Company (1907–1916)
- Builder: William Gray & Company, West Hartlepool
- Yard number: 442
- Launched: 28 May 1892
- Completed: July 1898
- Honours and awards: Battle honours: (RAN): Rabaul 1914
- Fate: Torpedoed and sunk on 21 December 1916

General characteristics
- Tonnage: 3,564 GRT; 2,329 NRT
- Length: 338 ft (103 m)
- Beam: 43 ft (13 m)
- Draught: 326.4 ft (99.5 m)
- Installed power: Triple expansion steam engine aft (Central Marine Engine Works, West Hartlepool)

Murex was a 3,564-gross register ton (GRT) M-class oiler, built by William Gray & Company, West Hartlepool in 1892 for Marcus Samuel & Company. She was the first bulk-oil tanker to pass through the Suez Canal en route to Thailand in 1892. She was chartered by the Royal Australian Navy and took part in operations against the German colonies in the Pacific with the Australian Naval and Military Expeditionary Force during the First World War in 1914, as an oiler. Murex was given the battle honour "Rabual 1914", for her service. She was later requisitioned by the Admiralty.

== Fate ==
Murex was torpedoed on 21 December 1916 by the Imperial German Navy submarine U-73 in the Mediterranean Sea 94 miles (151 km) off Port Said, Egypt, at 32°20′N 31°00′E and was sunk with the loss of one man.
