= Buxted Park =

Protected area in East Sussex, England

- Site of Special Scientific Interest
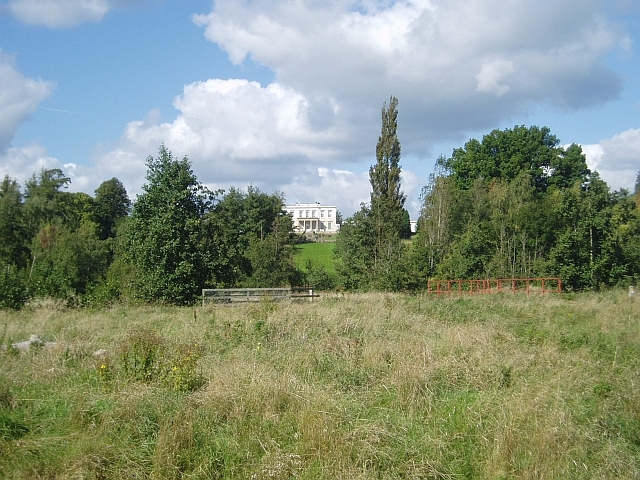

- Location within East Sussex
- Location of Buxted Park.
- Area of search: East Sussex
- Grid reference: TQ471249
- Coordinates: 51.005°N 0.098°E
- Interest: Biological
- Area: 83.43 ha (206.2 acres)
- Notification date: 1989

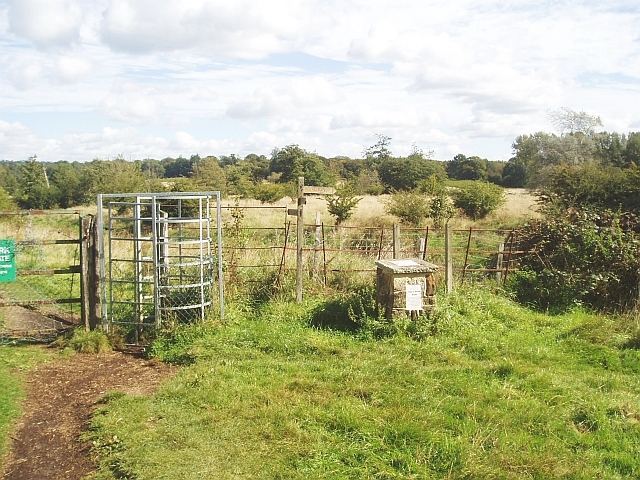

Buxted Park is an 84.7 hectare (206.16 acre) biological Site of Special Scientific Interest, located near the village of Buxted, East Sussex, England. The main house is just over 0.5 km northeast of the town of Uckfield. The site was notified in 1989 under the Wildlife and Countryside Act 1981. The site is an old deer park dating back to 1199, which consists of large amounts of unimproved grassland areas. The house which forms the centrepiece of the estate is now a country house hotel owned and operated by Hand Picked Hotels.

The park is famous for its herd of deer and a large artificial lake which is home to several exotic birds.

== Current mansion ==
The current Georgian house is Grade II* listed. It was originally built in 1725, but was later restored and remodelled by the architect Basil Ionides in 1940 following a fire. As part of the remodelling, Ionides introduced many original 18th century features salvaged from other properties including West Harling Hall in Norfolk and Chesterfield House, off Park Lane, London.

During the Second World War, the Royal Society of Arts relocated its valuable library of books and records to Buxted Park for safekeeping.

A garden wing and swimming pool were added during the 1960s by Kenneth Shipman, then owner of the Twickenham Film Studios, whose celebrity friends, including Gregory Peck, Marlon Brando and Dudley Moore visited the house after it was opened as a health hydro in 1966.

The property was sold in 1971 to Sheik Ziad Bin Sultan Al Nahyan, the ruler of Abu Dhabi, who at the time was the president of the United Arab Emirates. He sold it to the Electrical, Electronics, Telecommunications and Plumbing Union in 1987, who upgraded the hydro and opened the house as a hotel. It has since changed hands several times and is currently owned and operated by Hand Picked Hotels.

== St Margaret's Church ==
The 13th century St Margaret's church stands close to the mansion house. There is a yew tree within its grounds which was reputedly planted when the Manor of Buxted was created in the late 12th century. The church is the only remaining part of the village of old Buxted which was not relocated when the Manor was created; the rest of the village was moved around one mile to the northeast by the then owner, Lord Liverpool, so that it would not interrupt the views of the surrounding countryside from the mansion house, and to make the park larger and more exclusive.

== Site of Special Scientific Interest ==
The SSSI was notified in 1989 due to its value as an old deer park consisting of a variety of unimproved grassland communities with parkland trees which support a large invertebrate population. The park has been found to be of exceptional importance for the conservation of invertebrates, especially beetles and flies found on the marshlands and riverbanks as well as over mature trees and dead wood.
