= Porcelain services of the Rococo period =

Porcelain services that were produced during the Rococo period, roughly aligning with the reign of Louis XV of France from 1715 to 1774, included a variety of shapes or molds of dishes for use during savory and sweetmeat courses. These included plates, platters, tureens, sauce cups, cake stands, epergnes, wine coolers, and ice cream coolers, as well as porcelain molds not designed for food services such as étagère vases, flower vases, potpourri vases, toilet set bowls, and plaques inlaid into furniture. Two of the most famous manufacturers of rococo porcelain services in Europe were the Manufacture nationale de Sèvres in France and Meissen porcelain in Germany. While Sèvres worked almost exclusively in soft-paste porcelain during the rococo period, which was composed of a translucent mixture of clay, glass, and minerals such as feldspar and quartz, Meissen was the first European porcelain manufactory to produce hard-paste wares, which were modeled after earlier Asian imported porcelain which contained clay, minerals, and kaolin, which allowed the clay to survive much higher firing temperatures in the kiln, producing more opaque and stronger completed dishes than were previously available domestically.

== Ornamentation ==
Soft paste dishes produced in color often had two basic areas in the body: the ground colors, which were ground into a mixture that was mixed into the glassy frit body, and the reserves, which were left blank until they were hand painted and gilded after the dish was fired. Popular colors for the ground colors included bleu celeste, a light blue mimicking the color of the sky, bleu royal, a dark blue mimicking the blue on the French royal coat of arms, as well as other popular pastel rococo colors such as pinks, greens, and yellows.

Typically, the ground colors would cover the majority of the border areas of the dish, punctuated with oval or round blank areas called reserves. These white areas in the center and around the edges of the dish would form the space for artists to hand paint cartouches, or images, often modeled after classical allegorical motifs, on the finished mold after firing.

Finally, the painted dishes would then go to a gilder to paint the edges of the dish, as well as possibly the borders between the ground colors and the reserves, with a gold leaf mixture to produce the completed product. For more expensive services, a leather and cushioned case was produced to protect each dish during transit and storage.

== Savory course dishes ==
The first course of the meal during the rococo period was typically the savory course, which consisted of meats, stews, fishes, and sauces. The porcelain services for the savory course would include several plates and platters, as well as communal dishes such as tureens and meat juice cups.

Tureens were generally oval shaped pots with four-legged stands that sat on platters. The handle on the tureen lid often indicated the garnish for the meat inside. For example, a lemon or orange atop the lid of the tureen would indicate a citrus fruit garnish on the meat inside, while a leek or brussel sprout would indicate a vegetable stew mixed with beef or venison.

Adjacent to the tureen would often sit a meat juice pot, often with a folding lid, ornamented with a handle with similar fruit motifs to the tureen, reticulated with a hole for a spoon that would be used to baste the citrus juice over the meats. Condiments would be stored in smaller porcelain cups such as salt cellars and mustard pots, often with the cartouche or ground color of the cup indicating the condiments.

== Sweetmeat course dishes ==
The porcelain service for the sweetmeat courses would consist of several smaller serving dishes for cakes, fishes, ice creams, candies, and chocolates, as well as a few specialized pieces such as cake stands, epergnes, wine coolers, and ice cream coolers. Epergnes, which could be made from porcelain or metals, such as silver, functioned as a centerpiece for the table and were a treelike structure composed of a central stand surrounded by branches with small plates for sweets such as small cakes, candies, and chocolates.

Wine coolers and ice cream coolers were frequently cylinder -shaped dishes that tapered somewhat inward at their bases. A tin liner held the wine bottle or ice cream, and a cavity between the porcelain and the liner allowed for a mixture of salt and ice to chill the contents inside the liner. Ice cream coolers typically had porcelain lids and handles with motifs and cartouches depicting melting ice cream mixtures emanating from inside the cooler.

== Use of the porcelain ==
Rococo porcelains were often stored in a display cabinet or in a butler's pantry when not in use. They were then brought to a warming kitchen, where food was prepared on the dishes, before being sent to the dining room or other service area, perhaps a bedchamber, ballroom, or hermitage or retreat building. Some rococo palaces and houses had special equipment to transport the food courses from the warming kitchen to the service area.

A dumbwaiter was a relatively simple mechanical elevator, often powered by a pulley or simple steam powered mechanism, which carried the food courses and other utensils and accoutrements from the ground level, which typically contained the warming kitchen so that food could be brought inside from an outdoor cooking kitchen, to the level of the service area, where servants would then serve the dishes to the participants in the dining area.

A system of thieves, so named because they could commit a theft of the food courses from the dining table to the warming kitchen below, functioned similar to a dumbwaiter, but instead of raising the food courses to a cabinet off the service area from where the dishes would then be distributed by servants to the participants at the meal, each setting at the table had a hollow area within the table allowing an elevator to be placed within the table in front of each seat. At the upper surface of each of these elevators within the table, known as a thief, a small chalkboard and piece of chalk would be placed to allow each participant of the meal to write down their food requests from the menu. The thieves would then be lowered from the lower floor down to the level of the warming kitchen, where servants would read the menu orders written on the chalkboards, prepare the food on plates, place them on the thieves, and raise them back up to the level of the table on the upper floor. This obviated the need for servants in the dining room or other service area, which could be considered beneficial if the participants of the meal wanted greater privacy, particularly if classified information was being discussed.

The dirty dishes from the dining area would typically then be sent to the scullery, or prep kitchen, where the dishes were washed, before the clean dishes would be returned to the porcelain display cabinet or butler's pantry. On occasion, the porcelain belonging to one palace, castle, or house might be insufficient to serve a large number of guests at a special event. In this case, each palace would sometimes stamp their dishes with a palace mark before loaning them to the location where the event was to be conducted. The palace marks would aide in determining where to return each piece to after the event was concluded.
