= Frederick Stephens (businessman) =

English oilman

Frederick James Stephens
- Born: 30 July 1903; Bristol, England
- Died: 9 November 1978 (aged 75); Saint Brelade, Jersey
- Education: Marlborough College; University of Grenoble; Pembroke College, Cambridge
- Spouse: Sarah Clark (m. 1948; died 1954)

Frederick James Stephens (30 July 1903 – 9 November 1978) was an English oilman who worked for Shell from 1926 to 1971. From 1961 to 1967 Stephens served as the chairman of Shell Transport and Trading.

== Biography ==
Stephens was born in Bristol on 30 July 1903 to Canon John Frederick Douglas Stephens and Frances Mary Mirrlees. He was educated at Marlborough College (1917–21), the University of Grenoble (1922), and Pembroke College, Cambridge, where in 1925 he graduated Bachelor of Arts in modern and medieval languages. In 1926, Stephens joined Shell. He was posted to Venezuela, London, and the United States. In 1946 he assumed the position of vice-president of the Asiatic Petroleum Corporation in New York, which was the American subsidiary of Royal Dutch/Shell's Asiatic Petroleum Company. In 1948 he returned to London and held a series of senior postings with Shell.

While on vacation with his American wife at the Jokake Inn, Scottsdale, Arizona in November 1949, the Arizona Republic newspaper in an interview with Stephens contrasted his lifestyle with that of a top American oil company executive. The report said the American would have "a big home, a couple or three cars, servants, a well-stocked wine cellar and a flock of dollars left after taxes". Stephens meanwhile could not "afford to run a car, lives in a London flat and his pocket money is equivalent to that carried by an American newspaper reporter". The reason for the difference was put down to the high level of income taxes and sales taxes under the Labour Government in Britain.

In 1951 Stephens became a director of Shell Transport and Trading, in 1957 the managing director, and in 1961 its chairman. He held the chair until 1967. In his parting address to the 1967 annual general meeting, Stephens warned that burgeoning investment in North Sea gas exploration risked being cut back unless an economic price for gas was agreed. He advocated for market forces to decide the price. This was at a time when the gas industry was nationalised in Britain and suppliers were paid unit prices agreed with the Gas Council. Sir Maurice Bridgeman, chairman of BP agreed but Stephens' remarks were criticised by Labour's Minister of Power, Richard Marsh who retorted "I do not think it helps or scares anyone to have leading figures in the oil industry to publicly threaten to discontinue exploration unless they get the price they want." Stephens remained managing director of Shell Transport and Trading until his retirement in 1971. In 1951 he also became a director of Royal Dutch Petroleum and from 1956 to 1961 was a principal director. From 1959 to 1961 he was the managing director of the Shell International Petroleum Company.

On 27 April 1948 in New York, Stephens married Sarah Clark (1910–1954) of Dallas, the ex-wife of Spencer Fullerton Weaver Jr. She died in London on 19 July 1954 and they had no children. In 1956 he graduated Master of Arts from Cambridge. Following his retirement, Stephens moved to Jersey and lived at Les Ruisseaux Estate in Saint Brelade. He died on 9 November 1978 at age 75.
