= John Derian =

American designer and antiques dealer (born 1962)

- Born: 1962 (age 63–64); Watertown, Massachusetts, U.S.
- Occupations: Artist; designer; antiques dealer
- Known for: Decoupage
- Partner: Stephen Kent Johnson
- Website: johnderian.com

John Derian is an American artist, designer, and antiques dealer.

== Early life and education ==
Derian grew up in Watertown, Massachusetts. He was the youngest of six children. His mother was from Scotland and his father was an Armenian from Turkey.

Derian attended the Massachusetts College of Art and Design. He often skipped class during his second semester in order to visit flea markets. He left school soon after. He worked odd jobs in Boston and lived in an apartment with roommates on Harvard Street in Cambridge, Massachusetts. He moved to New York City in 1992.

== Career ==
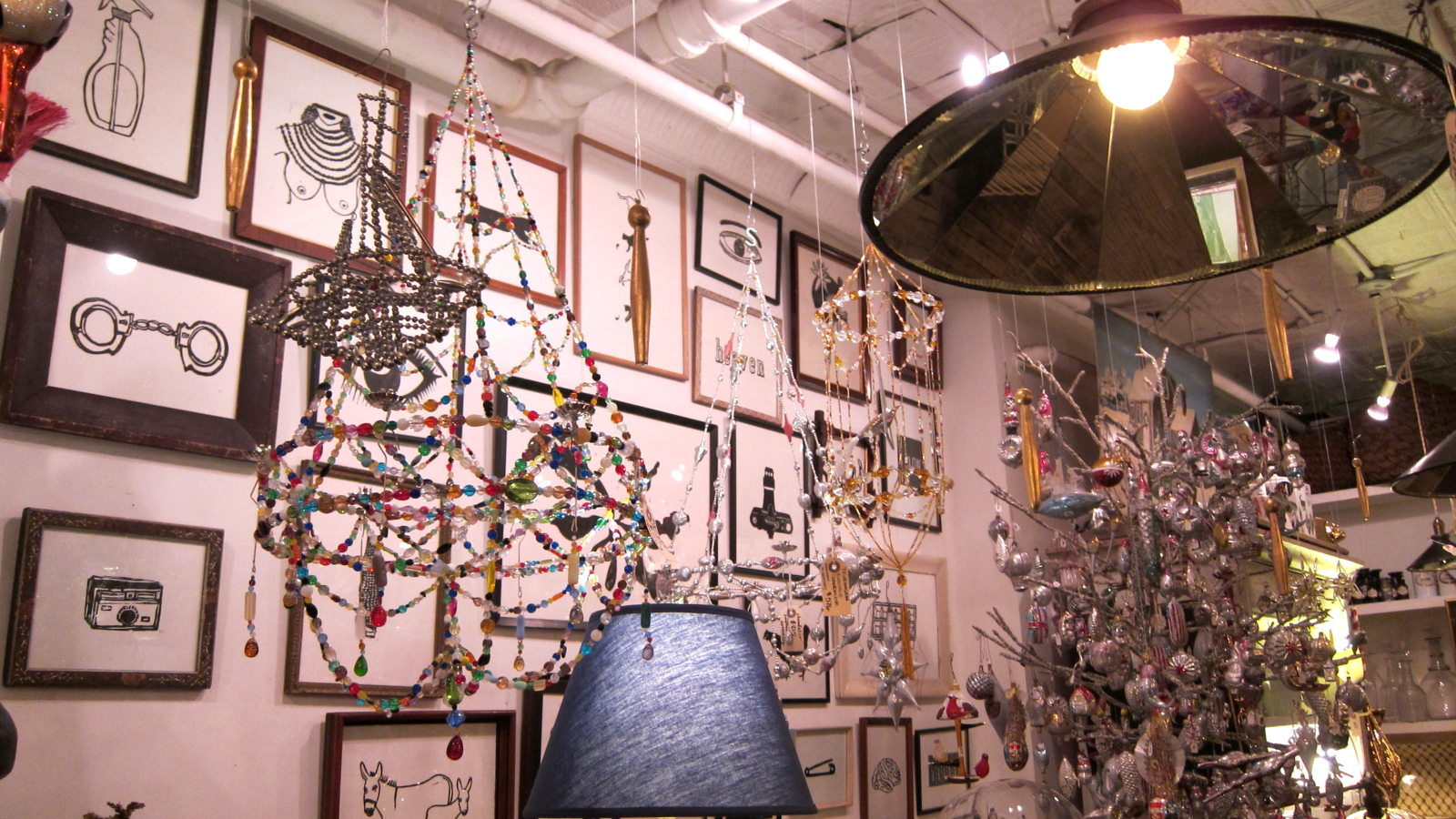
Interior of the John Derian Company store in Manhattan's East Village, 2015, with linocuts by Hugo Guinness

In 1994, Derian rented a storefront on East Second Street to use as a studio for his decoupage work. He soon realized that he could make the rent money by selling objects he created. He opened his first shop in 1995.

He sells his designs to 300 stores, including Bergdorf Goodman.

== Personal life ==
Derian's partner is photographer Stephen Kent Johnson. The couple lives in New York City's East Village and Provincetown, Massachusetts.
