= Through the Valley (novel) =

1950 novel by Robert Henriques

- First edition
- Author: Robert Henriques
- Language: English
- Publisher: Collins
- Publication date: 1950
- Media type: Print

Through the Valley, released in the United States as Too Little Love, is a novel by Robert Henriques, published in 1950. The story follows three generations and describes the period of upheaval in British society over two decades starting in 1926.

== Plot ==
It is a story about the decline of an English country house, Neapcaster Park, before and after World War II. It follows the growing up of three boys: Geoff, son of the estate manager Richard Greenley who grows up in the lodge and goes out hunting with the estate family; Ralph, son of General Harry Meredith, the owner of the estate; and David son of Daniel Levine, an intelligent but physically clumsy Jew.

In the first scene, set around a major hunt, Miss May one of the servants at the park, is seduced by Frank the footman. Subsequently, they marry. Frank becomes a taxi driver, and his gradual rise in the world mirrors the decline of the estate. That same night the three boys go clambering over the roof of Neapcaster Park. David falls, and it appears to be Ralph's fault. The friction between David and Ralph runs through the novel.

Another major character is Alex, a distant relative. She grows up abroad and only comes into the story in the second part. She marries Ralph but loves Geoff and in the end they are united.

== Reception ==
A review in TIME Magazine called Too Little Love a "the sort of monsterpiece in which there are so many wheels to keep turning that only a Tolstoy or a Melville could do the job without putting the reader to sleep". Kirkus Reviews called it "a tremendous panoramic novel" with writing that "seems almost sagalike at times", and suggested that "the basic structural weakness of the novel [was] that it deals with broad sweeps of social change, and uses people as props rather than instruments".

== Awards and nominations ==
This novel won the James Tait Black Award in 1950.
