= Marcus Samuel, 3rd Viscount Bearsted =

British peer and company director

Major Marcus Richard Samuel, 3rd Viscount Bearsted, TD, DL (1 June 1909 – 15 October 1986) was a British peer and a director of a number of companies, including Lloyds Bank.

== Education and Army career ==
Samuel was the son of Dorothy Montefiore (Micholls) and Walter Samuel, 2nd Viscount Bearsted. He was educated at Eton College before going up to New College, Oxford. He served in the Second World War with the Warwickshire Yeomanry eventually gaining the rank of Major before he was wounded in 1944. He received the Territorial Decoration (TD) in 1945.

== Later career ==
Marcus Samuel succeeded to his father's titles in 1948. Lord Bearsted was appointed deputy lieutenant (DL) for Warwickshire in 1950. Lord Bearsted held several directorships including of Sun Alliance, Lloyds Bank and Hill Samuel Group.

He made no speeches in the House of Lords.

== Personal life ==
Samuel married Elizabeth Heather Firmston-Williams on 15 January 1947 with his wife becoming Viscountess Bearsted in 1948. They divorced in 1966 and she went on to marry Ronald Grierson. The Samuel couple had two daughters:

- The Honourable Felicity Ann Samuel (3 April 1948) she married Robert Waley-Cohen on 9 December 1975.
- The Honourable Camilla Elizabeth Samuel (27 October 1949 – 29 December 1962)

Lord Bearsted's second marriage was to Jean Agnew Wallace on 24 January 1968 who predeceased him on 31 October 1978.

Peerage of the United Kingdom
Preceded by Walter Horace Samuel	Viscount Bearsted; 1948 – 1986	Succeeded by Peter Montefiore Samuel
