= Viscount Bearsted =

Viscountcy in the Peerage of the United Kingdom

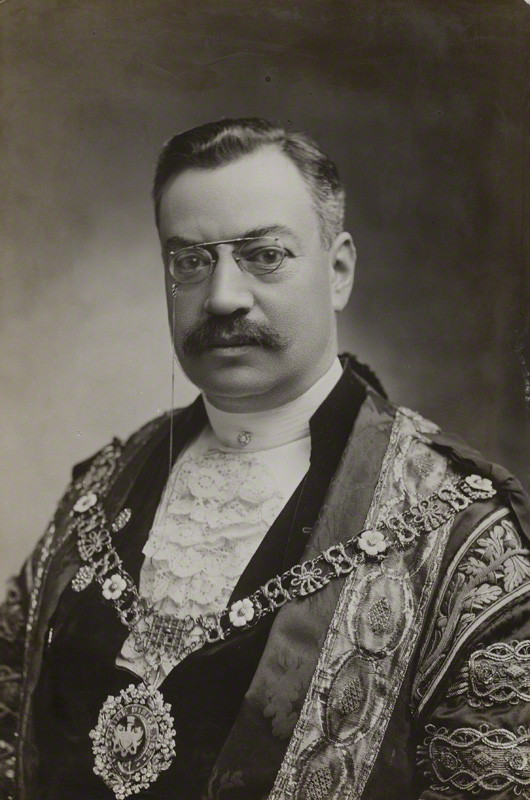
Lord Bearsted, ca. 1902.

Viscount Bearsted, of Maidstone in the County of Kent, is a title in the Peerage of the United Kingdom. It was created in 1925 for the businessman Marcus Samuel, 1st Baron Bearsted, the joint-founder of the Shell Transport and Trading Company. He had already been created a Baronet in the Baronetage of the United Kingdom in 1903 and Baron Bearsted, of Maidstone in the County of Kent, in 1921, also in the Peerage of the United Kingdom. The titles descended from father to son until the death of his grandson, the third Viscount, in 1986.

The late Viscount was succeeded by his younger brother, the fourth Viscount. As of 2017, the titles are held by the latter's son, the fifth Viscount, who succeeded in 1996.

The family seat is Farley Hall, near Swallowfield, Berkshire.

== Baron Bearsted (1921) ==
- Marcus Samuel, 1st Baron Bearsted (1853–1927) (created Viscount Bearsted in 1925)

== Viscount Bearsted (1925) ==
- Marcus Samuel, 1st Viscount Bearsted (1853–1927)
- Walter Horace Samuel, 2nd Viscount Bearsted (1882–1948)
- Marcus Richard Samuel, 3rd Viscount Bearsted (1909–1986)
- Peter Montefiore Samuel, 4th Viscount Bearsted (1911–1996)
- Nicholas Alan Samuel, 5th Viscount Bearsted (b. 1950)

The heir apparent is the present holder's son Hon. Harry Richard Samuel (b. 1988).

== Arms ==
Coat of arms of Viscount Bearsted
Coronet A Coronet of a Viscount Crest A Dexter Arm embowed proper grasping a Battle-Axe Argent the head charged with two Triangles interlaced Sable Escutcheon Gules on a Chevron between two Lions' Heads erased in chief and in base a Naval Crown Or a Heart Gules Supporters Dexter: a Horse Argent; Sinister: a Dragon Gules; each charged on the shoulder with a Heart Or Motto Facta Non Verba (Deeds, not words)

Baronetage of the United Kingdom
Preceded by Primrose baronets	Samuel baronets of The Mote and Portland Place; 26 August 1903	Succeeded by Brocklehurst baronets
