= Marcus Samuel, 1st Viscount Bearsted =

Lord Mayor of London 1902-1903

The Right Honourable The Viscount Bearsted JP
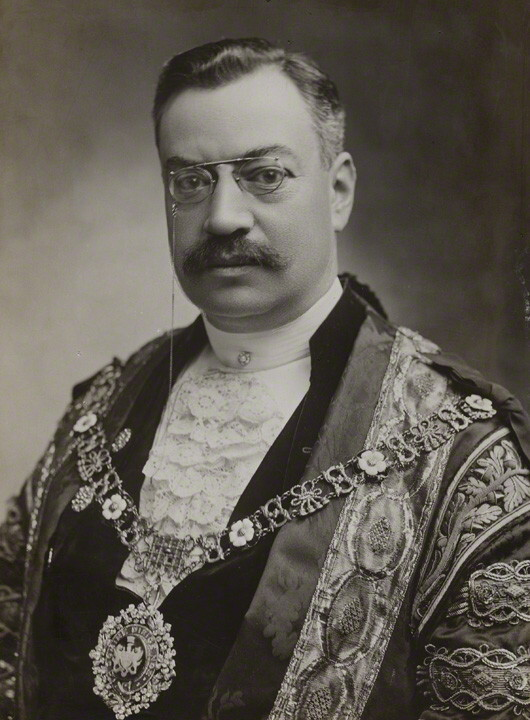
- Sir Marcus Samuel, Bt, ca. 1902
- Born: Marcus Samuel; 5 November 1853; Whitechapel, London, England
- Died: 17 January 1927 (aged 73)
- Known for: Founder, Samuel Samuel & Co; Founder, The "Shell" Transport and Trading Company
- Spouse: Fanny Elizabeth Benjamin (m. 1881)
- Children: Walter Horace Samuel; Nellie Ionides
- Relatives: Samuel Samuel (brother)

Marcus Samuel, 1st Viscount Bearsted, (5 November 1853 – 17 January 1927), known as Sir Marcus Samuel between 1898 and 1921 and subsequently as Lord Bearsted until 1925, was a Lord Mayor of London and the founder of the Shell Transport and Trading Company, which was later restructured including a Netherlands-based company commonly referred to as Royal Dutch Shell.

== Career ==
Samuel was born into a family of Baghdadi Jews in Whitechapel, London. His father, also named Marcus Samuel, ran a successful import-export business, M. Samuel & Co., trading with the coalition in the Far East, which Marcus carried on with his brother, Samuel Samuel. M. Samuel & Co launched the first Japanese gold sterling loan issued in London in 1897, and was largely concerned in the introduction of Japanese municipal loans, and in the development of the coal trade in Japan.

He was educated at Edmonton and in Brussels, and travelled extensively in Asia before settling down in business, visiting Ceylon, Straits Settlements, Siam, the Philippines, China and Japan.

Samuel realised the potential of the oil market during a prospecting trip to the Caucasus in 1890. In 1891, he secured a nine year exclusive deal with the Rothschilds, to sell Bnito's kerosene east of Suez. Samuel had commissioned the design and construction of a safer generation of tanker, safe enough to transit the Suez Canal. The first of which was Murex, that set sail from West Hartlepool for Batum on 22 July 1892, where it acquired its load of kerosene. The ship transited the Suez Canal on 23 August, and proceeded onward to his storage facilities in Singapore and then Bangkok, for retail distribution. Samuel then built ten additional ships, also named for seashells. In 1895, he received a concession in the Kutei region of east Borneo, where oil was discovered in 1897.

In 1897, he incorporated the Shell Transport and Trading Company, in reference to the trading business his father started as a "shell merchant". He was made a justice of the peace in Kent, a master of the Spectacle Makers' Company, and received a knighthood for helping a British warship grounded at Port Said.

Samuel had a long career in the civic government of the City of London. He was elected an Alderman of the London ward of Portsoken in 1891, and elected Sheriff of the City of London in 1894 (serving October 1894 to September 1895). While Sheriff, he took a leading part in the scheme for the unification of London by the absorption of the City and the metropolitan districts into the London County Council (which had been created in 1889). In late September 1902 he was elected Lord Mayor of London for the coming year (serving from November 1902 to November 1903), and received the traditional Baronetcy in 1903. During his year as Lord Mayor, he paid official visits to several English cities. Accompanied by the sheriffs, he visited Newcastle upon Tyne in late November 1902, where his wife named a Shell petroleum steamer, they made a journey down the River Tyne, and visited the Elswick works.

He was on the Commission for the Lieutenancy for City of London, a visiting justice of Holloway and Newgate prisons, and chairman of a City committee in connection with the Royal Commission on the Port of London (1900–02). He was also for three years a member of the Thames Conservancy board as the elected representative of the shipowners, and was a Justice of the peace for Kent.

In 1907, Samuel's company combined with Royal Dutch Petroleum to create the Royal Dutch/Shell Group, a holding company for Bataafsche Petroleum Maatschappij, containing the production and refining assets, and Anglo-Saxon Petroleum Company containing the transport and storage assets. Marcus served as a Director of the Alliance Marine Assurance Company. M. Samuel & Co., having transformed over the years to a merchant bank, merged in 1965 with Philip Hill, Higginson, Erlangers Ltd to create Hill Samuel, which is now a part of Lloyds TSB.

In recognition of his contribution to the British cause in World War I, he was created 1st Baron Bearsted of Maidstone in the County of Kent in the 1921 Birthday Honours. In the 1925 Birthday Honours, he was elevated to 1st Viscount Bearsted. Lord Bearsted was also awarded an Honorary Doctorate of Law (LLD) from the University of Sheffield during his lifetime.

== Personal life ==
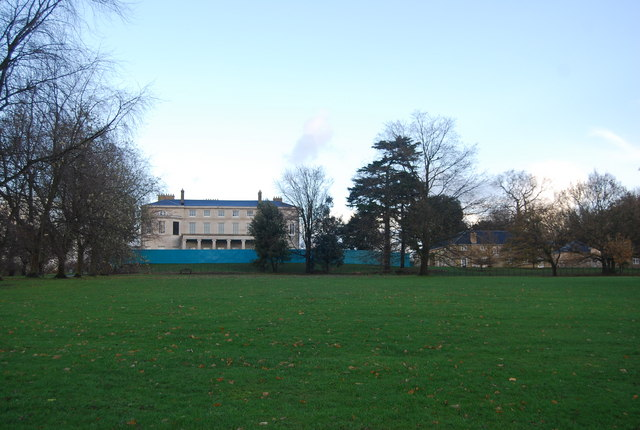
Mote House, Mote Park

Samuel was born into an Iraqi Jewish family in Whitechapel, London. He married Fanny Elizabeth Benjamin in 1881, a daughter of Benjamin Benjamin, of Stranraer House, London. Lady Samuel was godmother to the steam tanker SS Silverlip during a visit to Newcastle in November 1902.

Samuel went riding every morning at Hyde Park, London, and his country house was on a 500-acre estate in Kent, called The Mote.

== Titles ==
- Mr Marcus Samuel (1853–1898)
- Sir Marcus Samuel (1898–1903)
- Sir Marcus Samuel Bt. (1903–1921)
- The Rt. Hon. The Lord Bearsted Bt. (1921–1925)
- The Rt. Hon. The Viscount Bearsted Bt. (1925–1927)

== See also ==
- The Prize: The Epic Quest for Oil, Money, and Power
- Nellie Ionides

== Footnotes ==
Peerage of the United Kingdom
New creation	Viscount Bearsted; 1925 – 1927	Succeeded by Walter Horace Samuel
New creation	Baron Bearsted; 1921 – 1927	Succeeded by Walter Horace Samuel
Civic offices
Preceded by Sir Joseph Dimsdale	574th Lord Mayor of London; 1902–1903	Succeeded by Sir James Ritchie
Baronetage of the United Kingdom
New creation	Baronet (of The Mote and Portland Place); 1903 – 1927	Succeeded by Walter Horace Samuel
Business positions
Preceded by New creation	Chairman of Shell Transport and Trading; 1897–1921	Succeeded by Walter Horace Samuel
