= Peter Samuel, 4th Viscount Bearsted =

British peer and company director

Samuel in 1955.

Major Peter Montefiore Samuel, 4th Viscount Bearsted MC TD (9 December 1911 – 9 June 1996) was a British peer and a director of Shell Transport and Trading. He also was a deputy chairman of Shell Transport and Trading. Samuel was commissioned into the Warwickshire Yeomanry in March 1936. He served throughout the Second World War, being awarded the Military Cross in 1943 and ending the war as an acting major. He succeeded his elder brother in the viscountcy in 1986.

Peerage of the United Kingdom
Preceded by Marcus Richard Samuel	Viscount Bearsted; 1986–1996	Succeeded by Nicholas Alan Samuel
